The following is a list of characters that appear in the American animated series ThunderCats, its 2011 reboot, ThunderCats Roar, and its related media.

Original ThunderCats

Jaga 
Jaga (voiced by Earl Hammond in the original series, Corey Burton in the 2011 series, Larry Kenney in the 2020 series) is also known as "Jaga the Wise" and is based on the jaguar. This elder warrior was once regarded as the mightiest and greatest of all Thundercats by Lion-O himself. In his youth, Jaga was the Lord of the Thundercats, and rescued a young Hachiman from being trapped in the Jade Dragon (which later became a part of the Treasure of Thundera). An adviser and protector of the Lord's family, Jaga wielded the "Sword of Omens" and was a formidable fighter in combat. After Claudus was blinded, Jaga became the main guardian of the Eye of Thundera, the Sword of Omens, and the Treasure of Thundera. It was Jaga who gathered the nobles of the Thundercats to escort Lion-O and the Eye of Thundera to safety, but did not survive the trip to Third Earth as he volunteered to pilot the damaged ship while the others slept. Because of this, Jaga died of old age. However, Jaga does reappear on Third Earth as a ghost (seen only by Lion-O at first) to guide him in his lessons and adventures. At times, he appears before the other Thundercats as well such as when facing down Grune the Destroyer's ghost and when the Thundercats need to rescue their fellow Thunderians. Jaga's physical body does reappear at one point during the original series in the episode "The Astral Prison" where he was trapped in another dimension, prompting Lion-O to travel there to rescue him from being held captive by an evil inhabitant of said dimension. His fate as a physical living entity after this was never revealed, but his spirit form continued to appear throughout the series.
 
In the 2011 series, Jaga serves as head of Thundera's cleric warriors, possessing a knowledge of ancient secrets, superhuman speed, projecting lightning from his staff. In his prime, he used the "Sword of Omens" in an epic duel against Ratilla. At the start of the series, Jaga sacrifices himself to ensure Lion-O and his group escape. This resulted with him being tortured into revealing the location of the "Book of Omens" to Mumm-Ra, though doing his best to resist the villain's magic when sealed within a lantern, eventually his free will wavers along with his physical form. Though Jaga destroys the lantern that was keeping his soul intact to save Lion-O from Mumm-Ra, his soul took residence within the Book of Omens and becomes Lion-O's guide. In the 2-part "The Trials of Lion-O" Pt. 1, Lion-O encounters Jaga in the entrance to the Spirit World. Jaga tells Lion-O of the challenges he must undergo to gain a second chance in life. But when he failed the final test, Jaga allows Lion-O to return to the living long enough to save the other ThunderCats though it would exile Lion-O's soul to Limbo by sunrise. However, once saving his friends, Lion-O learns from Jaga that it was actually a test like the other challenges and allows Lion-O to remain among the living. Jaga character was described as being based on "Wisdom".

Lion-O 

Lion-O (voiced by Larry Kenney in the original series, Will Friedle and Tara Strong (young) in the 2011 series , Max Mittelman in the 2020 series) is the leader and the hereditary "Lord of the Thundercats". Lion-O, based on the lion, wields the legendary Sword of Omens, which is able to fire bolts of energy and allows Lion-O to see across great distances with its power of "Sight Beyond Sight", the sword  was created from the same star as the sword of plundar, the eye of thundera is the eye which belonged to a beast who was as gigantic as the mountain. He held immense power and was imprisoned in the gem forged by the ancestors of Jaga, who sacrificed themselves to save the Thunderians from his wrath, as well as the Claw Shield, a gauntlet that launches grappling lines from its claws. A mere child of twelve years old at the time of Thundera's destruction, Lion-O aged to adulthood during the trip to Third Earth when his suspension capsule failed to prevent him from aging too much. Although cunning and skillful, he is truly a child in a man's body, and throughout the series, must learn what it takes to become a true leader and gain true maturity.

In the latter half of the show's first season, Lion-O has to put all that he has learned to use in the "Anointment Trials", which consist of contests of strength, speed, cunning, and intelligence (this last is referred to as "mind-power" in the story arc) against each of the other Thundercats. (Complicating matters for Lion-O is the fact that he is required to be unarmed for the contests; moreover, the other Thundercats are not permitted to assist him. The Mutants attempt, but ultimately without success, to take advantage of this last in an effort to leave the Thundercats leaderless.) Ultimately triumphing over Mumm-Ra in a final battle ("The Trial Of Evil") in the heart of the villain's pyramid in which he discovers that Mumm-Ra, like any Egyptian mummy, is dependent upon his sarcophagus, Lion-O is crowned the true Lord of the Thundercats in a grand inaugural ceremony attended by nearly every inhabitant of Third Earth.

In the 2011 version, Lion-O is a teenager instead of being a boy inside an adult body. Lion-O can also be a bit of a hothead but is by far the most patient and understanding cat next to Cheetara. He is the only one at the beginning who believes that technology and Mumm-Ra exist even though the technology is sold across Third Earth. Lion-O believes that the other races of Third Earth should be treated equally as seen when Lion-O was defending two persecuted Lizards from some Thunderians until Claudus broke up the fight. After Claudus was killed by Mumm-Ra, Lion-O becomes the new Lord of the Thundercats. His catchphrase is "Whiskers!" whenever he finds himself in a bad situation. In "Legacy", it is revealed that Lion-O had an ancestor named Leo who played a part in the defeat of Mumm-Ra. Lion-O's weapons are the Sword of Omens and the Claw Shield. It is shown that Lion-O had feelings for Cheetara until in "Between Brothers" when she confessed her feelings for Tygra. In "Native Son", it is shown that Lion-O had an unnamed mother who died giving birth to him. In Recipe for Disaster it is shown that Lion-O had attempted to work through his relationship issues with Cheetara by pursuing Pumyra, trying multiple times to court her, all of which ended in disaster. However, after saving her from Mumm-Ra yet again she gives him a kiss on the cheek in thanks. However, in "What Lies Above Part 2", the feeling was revealed to be an act as she reveals her loyalty and love to Mumm-Ra and only toyed with Lion-O's emotions to further her advantage. Lion-O character was described as being based on Courage.

In ThunderCats Roar, Lion-O is depicted as being child-like with his antics annoying some of the ThunderCats. The episode "Claudus" revealed that Lion-S is Lion-O's long-lost sister.

Lion-O is renamed León-O in the Spanish version, Leo in the German version, Starlion in the French version, and Lion in the Brazilian version.

Originally Lion-O was to be named Lion-L in the English language version.

Panthro 

Panthro (voiced by Earle Hyman in the original series, Kevin Michael Richardson in the 2011 series, Chris Jai Alex in the 2020 series) is the next noble and greatest warrior after Jaga, and based on the panther. Even though a warrior in all forms of ThunderCats martial arts fighting, Panthro has a brilliant mind, which he uses as the chief mechanic/engineer and pilot for the ThunderCats. He is also physically the strongest and is a cunning warrior in combat, relying as much on martial arts as on physical strength. With Tygra's help, he builds all of the vehicles the ThunderCats use on Third Earth—including the ThunderTank, the Feliner and the ThunderClaw, ThunderStrike, and HoverCat. Panthro is a complex ThunderCat. On the one hand, he has great passion, love of family, and life. With an infectious laugh, accompanied by a good sense of humor. On the other hand, he is a stone-cold warrior. He lives by the ThunderCats warrior code. Pride, excellence, and loyalty are a hallmark of what makes Panthro tick. Because of his passion, he is known to lose his patience with other ThunderCats. On the field of battle, however, he is cool, calm and collected. Because of this, Panthro has gained respect both from friends and enemies alike. They respect the king but fear the panther. In combat, he uses a pair of nunchaku with open-away cat-paws, which house several chemical spray-compounds, and objects such as ball bearings, that he can use against foes. The spikes on his chest bands can be used as projectile weapons or as rappelling lines also. Panthro does have a fear of bats.

In the 2011 series, Panthro is one of Claudus' more loyal soldiers who was sent with his friend Grune to find the Book of Omens. Their attempted search resulted with Mumm-Ra's release and Panthro being betrayed by Grune, and ruing a struggle, fell down an abyss and was believed killed. However, Panthro survived the fall and constructed the ThunderTank, which he later used to save Lion-O's group from Slythe's platoon. Though he questioned Lion-O's ability to lead, Panthro eventually accepted him as the new king. Unlike the rest of the ThunderCats, he never learned how to swim. In "Between Brothers," Panthro duels with Grune when he and Slithe attack the Elephants' village against Mumm-Ra's orders. Panthro loses his arms while trapping Grune in the astral plane. He was later outfitted with mechanical arms built by the Berbils which can also elongate themselves. In "The Pit," it was revealed that he was an old friend of Dobo back when they were slaves in a gladiator arena called The Pit which was located in a city that is inhabited by Dogs. Panthro later escaped the Pit when it turned out that the match the next day would be a deathmatch. This caused Dobo to feel bitter towards Panthro until Panthro revealed the deathmatch would pit him and Dobo against each other. In "What Lies Above" it is revealed Panthro is afraid of heights, which he finds out during the Feliner's first flight.

Tygra 

Tygra (voiced by Peter Newman in the original series, Matthew Mercer in the 2011 series, Patrick Seitz in the 2020 series) is a staunch, level-headed warrior based on the tiger. Tygra is known as the ThunderCat architect and scientist. He is the one Lion-O often turns to as second-in-command and for counsel. He is responsible for the design of all of the ThunderCat structures on Third Earth—the Cat's Lair and the Tower of Omens. He is also gifted with "mind-power"—the ability to create lifelike illusions in other people's minds; he used this for Lion-O's Anointment Trial, but it puts a great strain on him. He uses a whip-like bolas in combat, with which he can render himself invisible to the naked eye. In the episode "All That Glitters", Lion-O instructs Tygra "If I do not return, you will be the new Lord of the ThunderCats". This verifies that indeed Tygra is the second-in-command. Tygra's weakness is that he is not able to swim when not invisible. Also, Tygra has shown to be easily influenced by external stimuli more than any other ThunderCat ("The Garden of Delights", "Turgamar the Tuska" and "Crystal Canyon"); he also claimed to be shy when being a kid. Patient, analytic and calm, Tygra is the quietest ThunderCat, and usually considers every part of the problem before making a decision.

Where creators Ted Wolf and Leonard Starr described Panthro's character as being based on "strength" and Cheetara's character as being based on "speed", Tygra's character was described as being based on "integrity."

In the 2011 series, the character is the adopted older brother of Lion-O. A flirtatious ladies man, Tygra possesses xenophobia, a jealous streak, and superiority to Lion-O in every way, all of which often serve to cause friction between himself and Lion-O. As he would learn later in the season, Tygra is of the Tiger Clan who were forced, by the spiteful other cat clans, to live in the frozen mountains far from Thundera due to their steadfast continued loyalty to Mumm-Ra even after the latter's entrapment. Sent to Thundera as a baby by his biological father Javan, Tygra was raised by Claudus and his wife with the latter loving Tygra dearly prior to her death while giving birth to Lion-O. Losing both the right to succeed his foster father and the only mother he knew, Tygra grew to hate Lion-O and questioning the latter's decisions after he became the new Lord of the Thundercats. Furthermore, Tygra fell in love with Cheetara when they first met as children in the past, although he believed she never returned his feelings for her. Her apparent friendship with Lion-O gave him another reason to bear a grudge on his brother. Tygra and Cheetara eventually become a couple after Cheetara confesses her love for Tygra. Soon after, Tygra meets his birth father and inherits his whip. In "What Lies Above" he is explained to be a natural pilot able to fly any craft without any training at all due to his ancestors serving as pilots under Mumm-Ra.

In ThunderCats Roar, Tygra is depicted as a neat freak.

Tygra is renamed Tigro in the Spanish, German and French versions.

Cheetara 

Cheetara (voiced by Lynne Lipton in the original series, Emmanuelle Chriqui and Grey DeLisle (young) in the 2011 series, Erica Lindbeck in the 2020 series) is a female warrior, based on the cheetah. She is the only adult female ThunderCat until the later appearance of Pumyra. She is as lovely as she is brave and caring. Often a voice of reason, she is also the bearer of a budding "sixth sense," detecting when something is unsafe or if evil is near. This precognitive sense, which Cheetara regards as a curse for the most part, also allows her to perceive visions—whether involuntary or by forcing herself—but can leave her very weak; she may require days to regain her strength. It was this ability that enabled Lion-O to learn the fates of Lynx-O, Pumyra, and Bengali the day when Thundera exploded. She has incredible speed, once clocked at 120 m.p.h. on a morning jog. She can maintain this speed only for brief periods, but with it, she is very fast in combat. Her weapon of choice is a baton that expands into a bō that can grow or shrink to variable lengths. When not in use, it is attached to her left armband. The season one episode "Sixth Sense" briefly hinted at the idea of romantic attraction between Cheetara and Lion-O, however, the subject was never revisited again in the series.

In the Wildstorm/DC comic book series it is revealed that, while most of the ThunderCats detest and avoid water, Cheetara loves it and is by far the best swimmer among them. In the Wildstorm/DC miniseries ThunderCats: The Return, Cheetara is revealed to have been made a slave of the mutants during Lion-O's time training inside the Book of Omens, and it is hinted that she was sexually abused by them, though it is never outright confirmed. The comic again references the ideas of a possible romance between Cheetara and Lion-O— seemingly expanding on the hints from the episode "Sixth Sense", indicating that feelings may have developed post-cartoon and pre-comics between the two— but indicates that Cheetara had begun to resent Lion-O after the defeat of the ThunderCats by Mumm-Ra and the Mutants and her ensuing enslavement for not coming to her rescue sooner, and her feelings had shifted towards Panthro in the intervening years, who is hinted to reciprocate her feelings when he and Lion-O manage to rescue her from the Mutants.

In the 2011 series, Cheetara is one of the last remaining cleric warriors. When she originally tried to join the Order of Clerics as a child, she was initially turned down by Jaga, because even though she had the speed possessed by clerics, she lacked the patience. Despite being turned down, Cheetara decided to show Jaga she had the patience needed to become a cleric and began to wait in front of the Order's doors. While waiting, she was given a flower by Tygra, which helped Cheetara sustain herself for days, until Jaga finally allowed her to join the clerics. In the aftermath of Thundera's downfall, Cheetara's possibly the sole surviving member of the Order, other than Jaga, who lives on in spirit form. Cheetara initially served as an encourager to Lion-O, since she never shunned him for his interest in technology and initially seems to support his kindness to other races. During the first half of the first season, both Tygra and Lion-O harbor romantic feelings for her and competed for her love. Originally many believed Cheetara held feelings for Lion-O and would choose him, but in the end, it's revealed she has always been in love with Tygra since their childhood when he had shown her kindness and support during the days she desired to become a cleric. Cheetara and Tygra become a couple shortly thereafter and Cheetara later abandons her duties as a Cleric in "New Alliances" to save Tygra's life.

In ThunderCats Roar, Cheetara has an athlete personality.

Cheetara is renamed Chitara in the Spanish version, Geparda in the German version, Félibelle in the French version.

In the WildStorm/DC comic mini-series, Tygra eventually marries Cheetara and the two raise a pair of twin cubs.

WilyKit and WilyKat 
WilyKit (voiced by Lynne Lipton in original series, Madeleine Hall in the 2011 series, Erica Lindbeck in the 2020 series) and WilyKat (voiced by Peter Newman in original series, Eamon Pirruccello in the 2011 series, Max Mittelman in the 2020 series) are twin siblings, Kat being the older brother and Kit as the younger sister where both of them are based on the wildcat; they are jointly referred to as "ThunderKittens" by the other characters, although technically they are older than Lion-O. In the original series, Kat appears to be the equivalent to a human that is twelve years of age. They are the mischief-makers, and often have their own lessons to learn alongside Lion-O while they live on Third Earth, where they frequently use tricks and traps to combat evil. Kit is the more adventurous, while the older Kat usually errs on the side of caution. Kit also appears to be the more agile, and at times, she employs a rolling-attack against the enemy. Their agility is often displayed when they ride their "space boards"—specially designed flying devices shaped like Earth surfboards that can carry them over long distances. Each uses special capsules, balls and other gimmick weapons carried in pouches and on their belts. They sometimes use slingshots to fire these at the Mutants or other foes. They also carry trick lariats, with which they can either tangle and ensnare foes, or use to pull themselves out of danger. In the first episode, they appeared to be slightly older than Lion-O, but when they went into suspended animation, they did not age as far in their suspension capsules as Lion-O did in his.

In the 2011 version, they are younger in age and were originally from a low-class family in the countryside living with their mother, their father, and their two siblings. When the two lost their father to a tornado, resulting in the family becoming more down-trodden, the twins resolve to run away from home to find the lost city of El Dara and become rich. However, upon arriving to Thundera, they were forced to become street urchins and lock-picking pickpockets in order to survive the slums with their aspirations the only thing keeping them going. When the Lizards attack Thundera, the two manage to escape during the chaos before eventually teaming up with the ThunderCats on their journey. In this version, WilyKit and WilyKat have tails, which none of the main adult ThunderCats except Panthro possess (how Panthro lost his is never shown nor explained), and visible external ears. Like in the original series, WilyKat possesses gimmick weapons with his usual weapon being a grappling hook called a Flick. WilyKit also possesses a special musical instrument called a Flupe that she uses to play a soothing melody that their mother used to hum to the siblings, able to put anyone in a hypnotic trance. During her time with the Elephants, learning to use her flute to shatter boulders when in tune with the Elephant's trumpets. Over the course of the first half in season one, Wilykit gained a spiritual outlook on life as she and her brother become more involved in their adult companions' fight. This new outlook allowed the youth to assume Cheetara's abandoned role of Cleric, encouraging Lion-O when he needs it the most. In the second half, the twins acquire hoverboards from the Berbils and later the Forever Bag, a magic bag previous thieves possessed that has an infinite storage space, activated by the magic word "rankinbass" (a reference to Rankin/Bass Productions, which produced the original series).

In ThunderCats Roar, Wilykit has a tomboy personality, while Wilykat is the more mature half of the duo.

WilyKit and WilyKat are renamed Felina y Felino in the Spanish version (except in the 2011 version, where they retain their original names), and MiniKit und MiniKat in the German version.

ThunderCats who appeared later in the series 
At the start of the series' second season, it was revealed to Lion-O (after having a recurring dream about the final moments of the destruction of Thundera) that there are three more Thunderians living on Third Earth whom Jaga was unable to rescue. They survived the cataclysm when rescued by a Ro-Bear Berbil scout ship piloted by two Berbils. The ship was damaged in the final explosion of the planet and made it to Third Earth landing on an unknown island somewhere in the northern sea as the ship didn't have enough fuel to get to the Berbil Village. This was revealed to Lion-O when Cheetara focuses her powers into tapping into this knowledge.

After Mumm-Ra tries to capture them to use as bait to destroy the ThunderCats at Firerock Mountain (which is where a lot of Thundrainium is located), these three Thunderians are rescued and brought back to the Cat's Lair, where Lion-O anoints them as new ThunderCats. They initially come to live in Cat's Lair until after the arrival of the Lunataks, at which time they are stationed at the Tower of Omens.

Bengali 
Bengali (voiced by Peter Newman) is one of the two younger Thundereans among the trio, named after the bengal tiger and resembling the white variant. This warrior is a skilled blacksmith like his father before him and it proves valuable after the Sword of Omens is once again broken. Fast and agile like Tygra, Bengali is called "brother" by him, but it is unclear if they share a true familial bond or if the greeting is merely meant as a term of endearment (given that the new ThunderCats repeatedly call the originals "Nobles" while referring to themselves as "mere Thunderians," it seems unlikely that there is any family relationship between the two). Another possibility is that because they are both tigers, the Ben-Gal clan may be cousins to the Tygra clan, even though one is considered nobility while the other is not. In combat, Bengali wields a weapon called the Hammer of Thundera (which he also uses when doing blacksmith-related work). It can shoot energy blasts, and carries smoke pellets in its handle, to allow him to cause confusion and provide cover for withdrawal from a fight.

He is the only Thundercat who does not appear in the 2011 series.

Lynx-O 
Lynx-O (voiced by Doug Preis in the original series, Kevin Michael Richardson in the 2011 version) is the oldest of the trio who is based on the lynx. Lynx-O was spared the sight of the destruction of their homeworld by a cruel twist of fate: a blast of intense heat and fire blinded him moments before he and his two younger companions were rescued, leaving his eyes all orange denoting blindness. Because of this injury, Lynx-O has had to adapt to survive on Third Earth and has done so by honing his other senses to super-human levels. His sense of touch, smell, taste and hearing are far above those of the other ThunderCats, and this affords him a type of "sixth sense," though it is not like the one Cheetara possesses. Though blind, Lynx-O is still a formidable fighter. His sense of touch allows him to find pressure points on a foe's body to knock them off balance or stun them. He can also feel vibrations, which allow him to evade attacks and capture, and can use a Sonic Reflector as a weapon in combat. His greatest skill comes in utilizing a special "braille board"—a device that allows him to translate information coming from sensor systems inside the Tower of Omens, enabling him to see into the gloom of Dark Side. This same device also allows him to pilot the ThunderStrike aircraft through the Valley of Mists when the ThunderCats need to find a way through to Dark Side.

In the 2011 series, Lynx-O is a general under Claudus. He first made a cameo as one of Thundera's lookout sentries. It is unknown as to whether or not he survived Thundera's destruction. If there was a season two, it would have depicted Lynx-O's history with Slithe and show how the Lizards sided with Mumm-Ra.

Pumyra 
Pumyra (voiced by Gerrianne Raphael in the original series, Pamela Adlon in the 2011 series) is another female Thunderian along with Cheetara and WilyKit. This young woman who is based on the puma is a talented healer and medic. She uses her knowledge of Thunderian medicine, combined with the wide range of medical supplies to be found on Third Earth, to help heal and cure her fellow ThunderCats. Her compassionate nature lends to offering an alternative perspective, solving problems or conflict without fighting by using compromise and understanding. Possibly the most agile ThunderCat next to the ThunderKittens, Pumyra employs an incredible leaping ability—often able to vault higher than even great jumpers like Tygra or the ThunderKittens. She was also shown to be able to move in short bursts of super-speed (while moving fast she resembled a flash of lightning darting from place to place). In combat, she uses special whipcord, which resembles a "cat's tail," that can launch special pellets and spheres like an ancient sling. Pumyra's role gradually decreased after her role in the first two movies. The only episode to focus on Pumyra was "Mumm-Rana's Belt" where she helps to regain Mumm-Rana's belt after it was stolen by Luna. In "The Return to Thundera Part IV," she and Tygra stay behind on Third Earth in order to continue protecting the planet from danger.

In the 2011 series, Pumyra is portrayed as bitter, spiteful, passionate, independent, agile, sly, and manipulative. She takes over Tygra's role in questioning Lion-O's decisions. Unlike Tygra, Pumyra easily manipulates Lion-O to side with her. Pumyra originally fought against the lizards during the fall of Thundera before being wounded and left to die under the rubble as nobody could hear her. In her final moments, she witnessed Lion-O, Tygra, Cheetara, WilyKit, WilyKat, and Snarf fleeing the city. Pumyra died hateful and resentful towards Lion-O and company for abandoning Thundera while they failed to hear her pleas for help. Sensing her strong hatred, Mumm-Ra resurrected Pumyra to give her a second chance in life, serving him as his spy, placing her among the captive Thunderian slaves to be sold to Dobo. From there, meeting Lion-O and managing to keep her need for revenge in check when she is unable to finish off Lion-O, Pumyra earns his trust and love while serving as a beacon for Mumm-Ra to regain the Sword of Plun-Darr and track the Thundercats' movement. Lion-O viewed Pumyra as a possible love interest and makes several attempts to impress her which usually result in her being injured, captured or humiliated. Although Pumyra often rejects Lion-O, on rare occasions she displays acts of affection to keep him obsessed with her. Cheetara is concerned with Lion-O's feelings for Pumyra and doesn't think she is right for Lion-O. It was during the siege of Avista that Pumyra reveals her true colors by giving the Tech Stone to Mumm-Ra, who she calls her true master and love. After taking a hit from Ro-Bear Bill and Dobo, Pumyra leaves with Mumm-Ra and promises to kill Lion-O the next time they meet. According to the creators if there had been a season two, Pumyra would've turned into a wicked insectoid due to her hunger for more power.

Thunderians on Thundera

Claudus 
Claudus (voiced by Earl Hammond in the original series, Larry Kenney in the 2011 series, Andrew Morgado in the 2020 series) is the previous Lord of the ThunderCats and Lion-O's father who like his son is based on the lion. Claudus ruled Thundera before its destruction. He lost his sight during a war he fought against the mutants of Plun-Darr. In the episode "Return to Thundera," Lion-O is transported back in time to Thundera the day before it was destroyed. He later rescued his father from past versions of Slithe and Vultureman (who were attempting to recover plans for a War-Bot that had fallen into the hands of Claudus's spies). He then proceeded to give these plans to Lion-O, who used them in the present to destroy the mutants' War-Bot. Believed to have died on Thundera while assisting the royal flagship in taking off, he was later found to have been captured by the Shadowmaster. Through a sequence of nightmares, Lion-O eventually learns from Jaga of his father's imprisonment in the Shadow Realm and is able to rescue him. Claudus is currently with Jaga in the afterlife.

In the 2011 series, Claudus is a stern father to Lion-O and the adoptive father of Tygra. He had a wife who died giving birth to Lion-O. When Grune and Panthro had fought bravely to get promoted to general, Claudus told them that he has given the job to Lynx-O. He was the one who sent Panthro and Grune to find the Book of Omens. When Lion-O was fighting off some Thunderians who were beating up two imprisoned Lizards (where Lion-O was assisted by Tygra and Cheetara), Claudus arrived to break up the fight. He was convinced by Lion-O to let the Lizards go free and back to their homeland. When Thundera was being attacked by the Lizards, Claudus is murdered by Mumm-Ra (who had assumed Panthro's form). Lion-O, Cheetara, and Tygra later hold a funeral pyre for him after escaping with the Sword of Omens.

In the 2020 series, Claudus was shown to have survived the destruction of Thundera. In this show, Claudus is depicted as a jerk and a bad ruler as well as having Lion-S as his daughter.

Thunderians on New Thundera 
When the planet of Thundera is reformed in Season Two of the series by Mumm-Ra in a plot to claim the Sword of Plun-Darr, the ThunderCats must work to stabilize the planet before it can tear itself apart again. It is here that they discover another ThunderCat and gain additional allies.

Jagara 
Jagara (voiced by Gerrianne Raphael) is found deep within the core of New Thundera. This powerful, ancient Thundercat (like Jaga, based on the jaguar) is an immortal sorceress. Her duty is to guard the massive gyroscope that keeps the planet intact. She uses the powers of levitation, teleportation, and psychokinesis to perform her tasks and to defend the gyroscope from attackers. It is noted by Jaga (no relation) that she has been acting in this capacity for countless years.

Thunderian commoners 
 Torr (voiced by Larry Kenney) – A young Thunderian commoner of indeterminate feline motive rescued by the ThunderCats along with other commoners from their ship drifting into deep space. Since then, Torr has been an ally of the ThunderCats where he has often helped the ThunderCats in various missions. In "Well of Doubt," Torr is shown to have a history with Baron Tass.
 Leah (voiced by Lynne Lipton) – A Thunderian little girl of indeterminate feline motive whose escape pod was intercepted by Mumm-Ra and landed in the Jungles of Darkness. Her doll was used by the Ancient Spirits of Evil to disguise the Mirror Wraith to infiltrate the Cat's Lair forcing her to keep it a secret. She was later freed from the influence of the Mirror Wraith by the ThunderCats.

Other Thunderians 
The following Thunderians appeared in different media projects:

 Leo (voiced by Will Friedle in the first appearance, Jason Marsden in the second appearance) – Exclusive to the 2011 series, Leo was Lion-O's direct ancestor and Mumm-Ra's right hand. Leo originally believed in Mumm-Ra's ideals for order across the cosmos prior to witnessing the death of the Plun-Darr galaxy. Deciding to engineer a rebellion, Leo gathered the scrapes from what remained from the creation of the Sword of Plun-Darr to create the Sword of Omens to defeat Mumm-Ra. In the aftermath of the Black Pyramid's descent to Third Earth, the Stones of Power taken from Mumm-Ra were split amongst the major races of Third earth with Leo keeping the War Stone with the Cats as the Eye of Thundera.
 Panthera (voiced by Cree Summer) – Exclusive to the 2011 series, Panthera was a Thunderian based on a panther who was among the Thunderians that worked for Mumm-Ra. Being Leo's second-in-command and girlfriend, she tried to convince him to betray Mumm-Ra. It was only after the death of the Plun-Darr galaxy that Panthera convinces Leo in planning a mutiny against Mumm-Ra. Her fate after the Black Pyramid's descent to Third Earth is unknown (although, given that she and Leo were implied to be a couple, it is possible that she married him and is also Lion-O's ancestor).
 Javan (voiced by Robin Atkin Downes) – Exclusive to the 2011 series, Javan is a Thunderian based on the Javan tiger and is the biological father of Tygra. His ancestors were shunned by the other Thunderians as the Tiger Clan branch of the Thunderians were still loyal to Mumm-Ra. When his kin was inflicted with a plague, Javan chooses not to turn to Thundera for aid and instead invoke the power of the Ancient Spirits of Evil to save his people. But once learning their price for their survival is the death of his newborn son Tygra, Javan couldn't bring himself to sacrifice the infant to honor their pact and send him away. As a result, the Ancient Spirits bound the souls of the Tiger Clan to the living world as cursed shape-shifting shadow monsters that obey the Ancient Spirits of Evil's every command at nightfall. Many years later while he and Lion-O were in the mountains, Tygra came across his ancestral home and meets Javan, expressing discontent towards the father who abandoned him. It was only later that Lion-O learned the truth of the curse as Javan tells him not to tell Tygra and get him away from the village before the sun sets. However, upon learning that Caspin and some of his royal court are going to kill his son, Javan fends them off before the curse takes effect and he mindlessly attacks Tygra. However, Tygra's act of humility broke the curse so both Javan and his kin are able to pass on to the next life. Tygra then inherits his father's whip.
 Caspin (voiced by Jim Cummings) – Exclusive to the 2011 series, Caspin is a Thunderian based on the Caspian tiger. He is among the tiger-based Thunderians that live in the mountains and serves their leader Javan as his right-hand Cat on his royal court. When Lion-O and Tygra came across the Tiger Clan's cave, Caspin took them to meet Javan. During this time, Caspin saw an opportunity to end his people's curse as he and his conspirators decided to kill Tygra themselves. However, Javan comes to Tygra's aid and was forced to kill Caspin in self-defense stating that it didn't have to be this way. Before dying, Caspin told Javan that it had to be this way since it was Javan's fault that the entire Tiger Clan was cursed. But as the curse is broken and the Tiger Clan was revealed to have already died long ago, Caspin's spirit body faded away alongside the spirit bodies of the other Tiger Clan members.
 Lion-S (voiced by Kaitlyn Robrock) - Exclusive to ThunderCats Roar, Lion-S is a Thunderian based on a lion. She came to Third Earth where she met Lion-O who found a kindred spirit in her due to the fact that they have good sword tricks and a talent for pranks like they did on Mumm-Ra and the Mutants. What Lion-O didn't know is that she is an escaped convict from the Gray Penal Planet who Mandora was after. While Lion-S managed to swipe the Sword of Omens, Lion-O revealed one other sword trick as he quoted "Sword of Omens, come to my hand." Lion-O allowed Lion-S to go which got the ThunderCats in trouble with Mandora for aiding and abetting an escaped convict. The episode "Claudus" reveals that Lion-S is Claudus' daughter making her Lion-O's sister.

The Snarfs 
The Snarfs are a race of intelligent cat-like creatures that are plump, fuzzy and kind. Snarfs are native to Thundera, living in the Valley of Snarfs, and many of their numbers act as servants to Thunderean nobility, happily working as cooks, nursemaids, squires and so forth. When Thundera was destroyed, forty-nine Snarfs were able to commandeer a Mutant tanker and made their way to an uninhabited planet which they took as their own, dubbing it the "Planet of Snarfs". Later, when Mumm-Ra recreated Thundera, he captured the Snarfs and brought them back to their home planet, putting them to work searching for the Treasure of Thundera. Subsequently, liberated by the ThunderCats, the Snarfs returned to living happily on Thundera.

Snarfs are the only creatures in the Universe incapable of evil (except while possessed), although, in episode 105, Snarf becomes corrupt with the power to control the other ThunderCats. Quick and clever, a Snarf is a loyal friend, though their small size often makes them a target for Mutants or other evil creatures. The Snarfs have proved to be valuable allies to the ThunderCats in times of peril. Though their fighting skills are more than wanting, the Snarfs have an inherent invulnerability/resistance to many (but not all) forms of magic and mind-control. This ability has enabled the Snarfs to save the other ThunderCats on several occasions. Snarfs are known to end their sentences with the squeaking exclamation for which they are named—"snarf, snarf!"

Snarf 

Snarf (voiced by Bob McFadden in the original series, Satomi Kōrogi in the 2011 series) is an elder Snarf, properly known by his name Osbert, which he hates. Snarf served as a nursemaid and protector for Lion-O when he was a boy. After Lion-O grew up, Snarf found that often Lion-O did not want to have him "mothering" or protecting him. Still, Snarf has remained loyal to Lion-O and the other ThunderCats. At times, he does come through in a pinch with an idea and takes action when it is needed. Despite his age, he does keep up with the others. Even though not a fighter by skill or nature, Snarf is very agile (he boasts he can outplay anyone at tail bail or kick-the-bucket). He also can communicate with other animals on Third Earth to enlist their help in his tasks, and once even tricked the Ancient Spirits of Evil into giving him a power-up to become a being called Snarf-Ra.

In the 2011 version, Snarf is more of a pet to Lion-O and does not speak English but can make animal sounds (though it seems Lion-O can still understand him). In later episodes, he goes "Snarf".

In ThunderCats Roar, Snarf is depicted as a robot animal. The episode "Snarf's Day Off" reveals that Snarf can take the form of a normal house cat once a month to pay a visit to an old lady named Mrs. Gristildi. He accompanied Mrs. Gristildi to the craft fair where she competed with a disguised Mumm-Ra. When Snarf's true form was revealed by Mumm-Ra, Mrs. Gristildi sheds her disguise revealing her true form of Mumm-Rana who beats up Mumm-Ra. Now knowing each other's secrets, both of them use the photos of Mumm-Ra's beatings for their homemade calendar.

Snarfer 
Snarfer (voiced by Bob McFadden) is a young and excitable Snarf who is Snarf's young nephew. He was thought lost when Thundera exploded but was one of the surviving Snarfs that made it to the Planet of Snarfs. Slightly more aggressive than his uncle, Snarfer is a keen mechanic and pilot in his own right, having been educated at "Snarf College" while majoring in Snarf-Studies (Snarf once said he was a "college boy"). He does tend to babble when over-excited, but at times he can be just as level-headed as Tygra. Though smaller than Snarf, he does not allow that to get in his way when he wants to help friends. It was through him that the ThunderCats learned, much to their surprise, that Snarf's real name was Osbert—and that he hated the name.

Snarf Oswald and Snarf Eggbert 
Snarf Oswald (voiced by Earle Hyman) and Snarf Eggbert (voiced by Larry Kenney) are two of the Snarfs who survived the destruction of Thundera, this duo became the ThunderCats main Snarf "contacts" on New Thundera. Oswald was originally mentioned by Snarf during the first season, noting that he owed him "fifty thunder-dollars."

Natives of Third Earth

The Ro-Bear Berbils 
The Robear Berbils are partly-furred robotic bears from the planet Ro-Bear. Because their homeworld is so tiny, they must form other colonies on distant worlds to survive. Small and harmless-looking, the Berbils are steadfast, hardy workers and skilled farmers, cooks, and craftsmen. It was thanks to them that Tygra was able to build Cat's Lair—and later the Tower of Omens—so quickly. Apparently, the Robear Berbils are cybernetic organisms, as they are able to eat and digest organic food. When they were first encountered, the ThunderCats protected the Berbil's candy fruit crops from the Trollogs and the Giantors.

In the 2011 series, the Berbils are shown to be more bear-like and have an ability to roll up into balls. The Berbils made themselves known to the ThunderCats when they helped to repair the Thunder Tank and give them food. Panthro was against their cute appearance first until it came to repairing Ro-Bear-Bill following an attack by the Conqueror (who had been abducting Berbils and selling them as slaves). The ThunderCats managed to help the Berbils drive away the Conqueror along with his Trollog and Giantor customers. The Berbils later help in constructing Panthro's new arms and upgrading the Thunder Tank. In "What Lies Above" Pt. 2, Wilykit and Wilykat were able to get the Berbils to help them fight Mumm-Ra and save Avista. After Avista was safely landed on the ground, the Berbils began working to get Avista operational again.

 Ro-Bear-Bill (voiced by Earl Hammond in the original series, Dee Bradley Baker in the 2011 series, Dana Snyder in the 2020 series) - A brown Ro-Bear Berbil and the co-leader of the Berbils. He is one of the first Ro-Bear Berbils to befriend the ThunderCats and often supply information about local places, people and phenomena on Third Earth. Through their fields and forests of fruit trees, they are also able to provide the Thundereans with new food stuffs. After the Mutants and the Lunataks were removed from Third Earth, Ro-Bear-Bill and Ro-Bear-Belle become members of the League of Third Earth.
 Ro-Bear-Belle - An orange Ro-Bear Berbil and co-leader of the Berbils. She is one of the first Ro-Bear Berbils to befriend the ThunderCats and often supply information about local places, people and phenomena on Third Earth. Through their fields and forests of fruit trees, they are also able to provide the Thundereans with new food stuffs. After the Mutants and the Lunataks were removed from Third Earth, Ro-Bear-Bill and Ro-Bear-Belle become members of the League of Third Earth.
 Ro-Bear-Bert - A blue Ro-Bear Berbil who is skilled at agriculture, is an expert cook, and doesn't talk much. He and Ro-Bear-Bob were the ones who saved Lynx-O, Bengali, and Pumyra from the destruction of Thundera by inviting them on their ship which Ro-Bear-Bert piloted. The ship was damaged upon evading the explosion of Thundera and landed on an island on Third Earth since it didn't have any more power to get back to the Berbil Village. The two Berbils alongside the other three ThunderCats ends up landing on an uninhabited island where they lived until they were caught by Hammerhand and his pirates. Ro-Bear-Bert and Ro-Bear-Bob were later rescued by the ThunderCats and assumed to have been reunited with the other Berbils.
 Ro-Bear-Bob - A yellow Ro-Bear Berbil. He and Ro-Bear-Bert were the ones who saved Lynx-O, Bengali, and Pumyra from the destruction of Thundera by inviting them on their ship. The ship was damaged upon evading the explosion of Thundera and landed on an island on Third Earth since it didn't have any more power to get back to the Berbil Village. The two Berbils alongside the other three ThunderCats ends up landing on an uninhabited island where they lived until they were caught by Hammerhand and his pirates. Ro-Bear-Bob and Ro-Bear-Bert were later rescued by the ThunderCats and assumed to have been reunited with the other Berbils.

Warrior Maidens 
The Warrior Maidens are a race of barefoot Amazon women who live in the forests of what is called the Tree-Top Kingdom. They are fierce fighters and very territorial. At first distrustful of the ThunderCats (whom they view as aliens), the Warrior Maidens soon treat them as friends. Often, Nayda and Willa are the two who have the most contact with the ThunderCats. While some of the Warrior Maidens resemble Native Americans, other Warrior Maidens have different skin tones, whereas some of the Warrior Maidens have red hair.

 Willa and Nayda (both voiced by Lynne Lipton in the original series, Laila Berzins and Cindy Robinson in the 2020 series) – Sisters who are both members of the Warrior Maidens. Willa is their leader while the younger Nayda is a scout and second-in-command. Both are expert markswomen with bows and arrows and are very agile and fleet among the branches of their forest home. Often distrustful of outsiders, both become friends of the ThunderCats, and, by their example, the rest of their people treat them as allies. They often help the Thundereans by showing them paths around Third Earth and using special tricks (like a giant tree-top spider Bushy when it came to rescuing Tygra from Castle Plun-Darr) to aid them on their quests and missions. On one occasion, Willa is even able to use the Sword of Omens' "Sight Beyond Sight," which normally is possible only for Lion-O. After the Mutants and the Lunataks are removed from Third Earth, Willa and Nayda become members of the League of Third Earth. In the 2020 series, Willa mostly speaks in grunts with Nayda translating for her.

Wolos 
The Wolos are small, furry people who have small villages all around the habitable places of Third Earth. The Wolos work as farmers, carpenters, and fishermen. The Wolos often use donkeys for their transportation. They are gentle folk who often turn to the ThunderCats for protection.

In the 2011 series, the Wolos (pronounced "Wallow" in the reboot) are shown to have rodent-like teeth.

 Ponzi (voiced by Jim Meskimen) – Exclusive to the 2011 series, Ponzi is a scam artist who travels from town to town to sell "miracle elixir" that he promises will solve all customers' problems. However, the elixir has unpredictable side effects that force him to leave town. However, meeting the ThunderCats, Ponzi learns his elixir has a neutralizing effect on Sycorax (a monster that Mumm-Ra resurrected as his vessel). He helps the Thundercats with gathering Caracara leaves to make a new batch of elixir and Lion-O with winning Pumyra's affection, though both attempts to help backfire with Ponzi's caterpillar Lucy eating all the Caracara leaves as Sycorax arrives. Upon metamorphosing into her butterfly-like adult stage, Lucy uses the Caracara leaves in her body to crystallize Sycorax causing Mumm-Ra to retreat. Soon after, Ponzi and Lucy take their leave to start their business anew.

Bolkins 
The Bolkins are sheep-like people, similar to the Wolos. They are herdspeople and farmers who are just as likely to call for help from the ThunderCats.

 Bundun and Hurrick (voiced by Bob McFadden) - Two Bolkins who are friends with each other. They were the ones who accidentally released the spirit of Grune the Destroyer when they were trying to escape from the bad weather. After Jaga's spirit defeated Grune the Destroyer, Bundun and Hurrick were forgiven for their mistake by the ThunderCats.

Tabbuts 
The Tabbuts are a race of wealthy yet greedy traders who often appeared as allies of the mutants. They resemble one-horned humanoid pigs in appearance. A ninja that worked for Mumm-Ra once assumed the form of a Tabbut.

Fishmen 
Exclusive to the 2011 series, the Fishmen are one of the native sentient species of Third Earth and resembled humanoid fish-like creatures. Fishmen sub-species are mostly based in appearance on the Ostariophysi-based fish and include carps, suckerfish, loaches, goldfish, and minnows. A group of their kind lived in a paradise oasis, somewhere in the Sand Sea until their home was attacked by the massive Ramlak, which consumed all the water of their home. With their home destroyed, Captain Koinelius Tunar, became fixated on getting revenge on the creature and assembled a crew of Fishmen along with a ship to hunt it down. Their journey saw them encounter the ThunderCats, under Lion-O who they captured, and initially attempted to flay as well as eat until the Ramlak attacked. Upon seeing the courage of Lion-O, Captain Tunar decided to let the ThunderCats live and asked for their help in slaying the beast. Ultimately, the Fishman's ship was destroyed by the Ramlak and Captain Tunar was killed but Lion-O managed to slay the creature leading to all the captured water being released into the Sand Sea thus creating an oasis for the Fishmen. The Fishmen thanked Lion-O, assuring him that Tunar's death was his own doing and was beyond help, and decided to remain behind at their new home. In "What Lies Above" Pt. 2, Wilykit and Wilykat were able to get some of the Fishmen to help them fight Mumm-Ra and save Avista. One Fishman rode with Wilykit and Wilykat since it didn't want to ride in the Forever Bag.

 Captain Koinelius Tunar (voiced by Robin Atkin Downes) – A member of the Fishmen race who was driven to vengeful rage by the Ramlak stealing both his homeland and his leg, the latter he replaced with a metallic peg leg. He later took command of a ship and assembled a crew of Fishmen with the task of hunting the creature down, claiming actions were in the crew's best interest yet places killing the Ramlak at all costs before them. Encountering the Thundercats with the intent to make them into chum to attract his quarry, Tunar reconsiders once seeing them fight the Ramlak and makes them part of his crew while finding common ground with Lion-O, who is also out for revenge on Mumm-Ra. However, while Lion-O lets go of his revenge to save the Fishman's crew, Tunar became a victim of his own revenge as he is dragged into the Sand Sea while harpooning the Ramlak. Lion-O managed to avenge him by slaying the Ramlak.

Elephants 
Exclusive to the 2011 series, the Elephants are a giant grey-skinned race brought to Third Earth when the black pyramid fell alongside the other Animals that Mumm-Ra enslaved. A normally passive race that rarely fights, the Elephants are spiritualists who don't have much of a good memory and can speak in an Indian accent. When the ThunderCats encounter their colony while on their search for the Warstones, the Elephants reveal that they have one yet forgot the item's exact location in their village. After the ThunderCats returned from the Forest of Magi Ore, the Elephant village was attacked by Grune and his forces. The ThunderCats were able to save the village and its people from the Lizards occupation, with the Elephants later coming to conclusion to aid in fending off the invading forces.

 Anet (voiced by Kevin Michael Richardson) – Exclusive to the 2011 series, Anet is a member of the Elephants race and is an ally of the ThunderCats. Anet appears to be a high-ranking spiritual leader among the Elephants. After he and Lion-O meet, Anet personally instructs Lion-O in the use of "Sight Beyond Sight". Anet has the ability to see visions of the future, telling Lion-O of the betrayal yet unable to specify it to be the king's relationship to Cheetara. In "What Lies Above" Pt. 2, Anet and some of the Elephants were recruited by Wilykit and Wilykat into helping them fight Mumm-Ra and save Avista. Anet stated that they are doing this to repay Lion-O.
 Aburn (voiced by Jim Meskimen) – Exclusive to the 2011 series, Aburn is also a member of the Elephants race, and is an ally of the ThunderCats. Aburn is the first of the Elephants to speak with the ThunderCats, befriending Wilykit and her brother while overhearing the former playing her instrument. During "Into The Astral Plane" Grune held Aburn hostage in order to force the ThunderCats to surrender, prior to Tygra was able to slip away and save everyone using the ThunderTank.

Dogs 
One of the many elements featured in the 2011 series that seems to have been "inspired" by the Wildstorm/DC Comics mini-series, the Dogs were a rival species to the Thunderians. Each of the Dogs are modeled after Doberman Pinschers, Pit bulls, jackals, wolves, foxes, Labrador Retrievers, Mastiffs, Bulldogs, Boxers, Sheepdogs, Spaniels, and other types of canines. Many of the Dogs have bitter feelings towards the Thunderians while some others lived in Thundera's slums as second class citizens prior to the city's fall. Normally living in the Dog City within the desert, the Dogs own a variety of ramshackle bazaars and bars. They also have a gladiatorial arena know colloquially as "The Pit" which is part of their justice system as criminals are made slaves (unless if the slaves were bought from someone else) to fight against each other in combat until they have either paid their debt with 100 wins or have died in battle.

 Jorma (voiced by Corey Burton) – A dog who is a resident of Thundera's slums. Jorma is a mechanic by nature who sold technology to Lion-O at his junk shop. After Thundera's fall, Jorma moved back to Dog City where he is later reunited with Lion-O and plays a role in directing the Thundercats to Avista.
 Dobo (voiced by Fred Tatasciore) – Bearing an uncanny similarity to the Doberlord character featured in the Wildstorm/DC Comics mini-series, Dobo is a Doberman Pinscher-type dog who was originally a thief prior to the series. Dobo was paired with Panthro (a prisoner of war at the time) to earn his freedom from The Pit. Though the two were a powerful team, Dobo soon finds himself on his own when Panthro managed to escape. Earning his freedom, Dodo succeeded his predecessor and became the new Pit Master while having somewhat forgiving his friend and developing an idea to trust no one. Crossing paths with Panthro while having acquired Pumyra from the Rats, Dobo took offense to Lion-O's attempt to free his property locking him in the nearby cell with intent to put him again Pumyra while confiscating the Sword of Omens. Panthro was not pleased with Dobo's actions as Dobo tells him that Lion-O will go free if he defeats Pumyra. During Lion-O's fight with Pumyra, Panthro reveals that he escaped the Pit after learning he was to fight Dobo and did not want to forcefully kill him. When Pumyra is unable to finish off Lion-O, Dobo states that the penalty for forfeit is death. The crowd then chants for Dobo to spare her and Lion-O. Dobo then gives Lion-O and Pumyra their freedom. In "What Lies Above" Pt. 2, Dobo is among the Dogs that helps Wilykit and Wilykat to help to fight Mumm-Ra and save Avista. He does manage to knock down Pumyra before she and Mumm-Ra retreat with Mumm-Ra's forces.
 Dog Constable (voiced by Jim Meskimen) – The Dog Constable is a Boxer who is a stern law enforcer in the City of Dogs and has had some run-ins with Tookit. He is very tough and holds the law up in high standards and will arrest anyone who has broken the law no matter how old they are. The Dog Constable eventually learns that Tookit has been manipulating some orphans to do his dirty work upon overhearing Wilykit and Wilykat standing up to him. Although Tookit made a run for it, the Dog Constable gave chase and caught him when Wilykit and Wilykat had switched the Forever Bag with the real bag. The Dog Constable ended up remanding Tookit to The Pit.

Birds 
Exclusive to the 2011 series, the Birdmen are a species of humanoid birds brought to Third Earth when the black pyramid fell alongside the other Animals that Mumm-Ra enslaved. They are the most culturally, artistically, and technologically advanced race on Third Earth, living in a democratic style of society in the treetop Bird Nation, as well as the majestic city in the sky Avista. They are fair, hospitable, and generous, but they are also arrogant, believing that the other Animals are primitive and unsophisticated, and thus not worthy of their spare time. Technology provides for their every practical need, but they can also fly under their own natural wing power. Like the Dogs and the Fishmen, the Birds have many diverse sub-species such as birds of prey, crows, ravens, pigeons, parrots, geese, magpies, storks, ducks, pelicans, macaws, cockatoos, mockingbirds, catbirds, doves, cranes, and many more. Addicus the Monkey committed vile crimes against the less-technological Bird Nation where was caught and sentenced to death only to be saved at the last moment by Slithe the Lizard. He then proceeded to murder and eat the Birds present offscreen at his intended execution as he was promised a "last meal." Later, when Lion-O fracked the Tech Stone to Avista with the other ThunderCats, he was arrogantly brushed off by their perfect Vultaire. After the Cats failed to get the Stone following an unfair racing challenge in the air, they tracked the Stone themselves to the core power chamber of Avista. However, they were caught and sentenced to be "thrown out with the trash" by Vultaire, literally until Mumm-Ra came with his Lizards to steal the Tech Stone. The Cats were allowed to help the Avistans defend the city. The Ravenmen and Vultaire defended the skies as best they could, but the superior fighting skills of the Lizards and the destructive power of Mumm-Ra soon decimated the fleet causing Vultaire to defect to Mumm-Ra's side. After Mumm-Ra stole the Tech Stone, the city began to fall, due to the Stone generating anti-gravity emissions, but after Mumm-Ra and the Lizards evacuated, Panthro managed to land the city safely and saved the lives of most of the Avistans, who were grateful to the ThunderCats for saving them. Cheetara promised them that the equally technologically-talented Berbils would repair their city and return it to the sky.

 Horus – Horus is a pigeon-like Bird of Avista. Apparently, he's an aristocrat of the city as well as Vultaire's attaché. Horus stays by the Vultaire's side much of the time. He went along with Vultaire's arrogant attitude and opposition to the ThunderCats until Mumm-Ra invaded Avista and the Cats helped them defend it. Horus participated in the defense of Avista and he did not follow Vultaire's footsteps when the latter treacherously defected to Mumm-Ra's side. His fate after the battle and the fall of Avista is unknown, but it is likely that he survived and allied with the Cats along with the other Avistans.
 Raven Men – The Raven Men are the elite military of Avista. Armed with electric shock spears and dressed in red uniforms and steel helmets, they are highly intelligent, like real ravens and have advanced military knowledge, more so than the Lizards possibly, although the Lizards took advantage of their easy-to-shoot-down flight formations. Their SkyCutter squadrons are named after birds of prey like ospreys and kestrels. They were initially antagonists to the ThunderCats, treating them like prisoners and trespassers, but later, when the ThunderCats proved to be better leaders and defenders than their treacherous prefect, the Ravens followed the Cats' lead, especially Tygra's. A substantially large number of Ravenmen and SkyCutters were destroyed by Lizard warships and Mumm-Ra's power, but some may possibly have survived Avista's downfall and allied themselves with the ThunderCats.

Other Third Earth Races 
The following races were also featured throughout the series:

 Brute-Men – A tribe of unintelligent humanoid bovine-like creatures. They were once enslaved by the Mutants to build Castle Plun-Darr.
 Cavemen – A race of primitives that live on Third Earth. In "The Time Capsule," Lion-O had to arm wrestle a caveman in order to claim a Thunderan Time Capsule.
 Crabmen – A race of humanoid crabs that live on Third Earth. They reside on the beaches and are very territorial.
 Feerits – The Feerits are a tribe of humanoids that live along the river. They are known to attack any foreign lifeform that comes near their territory. In "Lion-O's Anointment Day: The Trial of Speed," Lion-O had an encounter with the Feerits.
 Gargoyles – The Gargoyles of Third Earth resemble winged demon-like humanoids that are made of stone. They are often used as guardians and servants for certain powerful figures. In "The Tower of Traps," a bunch of Gargoyles resided in the Black Tower where they have served the late Baron Karnor into stealing from the inhabitants of Third Earth while terrorizing them. These Gargoyles were destroyed by the ThunderCats. In "The Sound Stones," two Gargoyles work for Sondora and help her to guard the Sound Stones.
 Giants – The Giants of Third Earth are large human-like beings. They live in a cliffside area next door to a group of trolls as seen in "All That Glitters."
 Giantors – The Giantors are a race of large ogre-like creatures that live at the top of the mountains. They force the Trollogs into hunting the Berbils' candy fruit crops. After Lion-O had fended off the Trollogs, the Giantors had to come to the Berbil village themselves. Lion-O called for the other ThunderCats and they were able to drive away from the Giantors. In the 2011 series, the Giantors still have the Trollogs work for them, but also buy some slave captured by the Conquedor. After Lion-O freed the slaves, Conqueror led the Giantors and the Trollogs into recapturing the Berbils. With help from the Berbils, the ThunderCats were able to drive away Conqueror, the Giantors, and the Trollogs.
 Kymeras – A race of robot-like aliens that terrorize the Terators.
 Mermaids – A race of half-human half-fish creatures. In "Turmagar the Tuska," Tygra falls into the spell of a Vampire Mermaid.
 Micrits – A race of tiny humans that live near the Cats' Lair. They are farmers by trade and live in primitive huts. In "The Micrits," the Micrits' village had been run-over by the Thunder Tank. When Lion-O later came near their village, the Micrits tied Lion-O up with rope made with Thundranium. Snarf later had to offer himself to them so that Lion-O can help fight off the Mutants. To prevent any further destruction of the Micrit's village, the ThunderCats put up signs around their village to let anyone who passes by know that the Micrits live here. In ThunderCats Roar, the Micrits are led by Emperor Toadius (voiced by Steve Blum) who has a son named Prince Starling (voiced by Cedric L. Williams).
 Molemen – A race of small humanoid moles that live underground. They aren't too friendly even to those who rescue them. Some of the Molemen were enslaved by Molemaster until Tygra defeated him.
 Mudhogs – A race of humanoid common warthogs that live underground and are easily blinded by bright lights. They once captured Quick Pick and Mandora planning to feed them to a giant bird. In the nick of time, Lion-O and the other ThunderCats arrived to save Mandora and Quick Pick where the Thunder-Tank's lights drove away from the Mudhogs.
 Petalars – Exclusive to the 2011 series, the Petalars are a race of small flower people that have a very short lifespan that lasts only one day. However, the Petalars' sense of time differs from that of other races, so hours seem like years to them. A Petalar named Emrick (voiced by Atticus Shaffer as a child, Patrick Cavanaugh as an adult, James Arnold Taylor like an old man) taught him the value of life before passing away.
 Snowmen - A race of Yeti-like creatures that reside on Hook Mountain. They are a savage and proud race.
 Terators – A race of aliens whose homeworld was destroyed by the Kymeras.
 Trolls – The Trolls of Third Earth are small creatures that are similar in appearance to the Bolkins and the Wolos. The Trolls are known to ride Hoppers. They live in a cliffside area next door to a group of Giants. In "All That Glitters," Mumm-Ra once assumed the form of Grygory Grygion in order to trick Lion-O into attacking Tygra which would lead to the Sword of Omens getting broken.
 Trollogs – A race of humanoid Bulldogs that live in the caves that are north of the Berbil Village. They are forced by the Giantors to raid the Berbils' candy crops. When Lion-O fought off the Trollogs, the Giantors did not take the news of this lightly and went to the Berbil Village themselves. In the 2011 TV series, the Trollogs are shown with the Giantors into buying slaves from Conquedor. After Lion-O freed the slaves, Conquedor led the Trollogs and the Giantors into attacking the Berbil Village. With help from the Berbils, the ThunderCats managed to fend off Conquedor, the Trollogs, and the Giantors.
 Tuskas - A race of humanoid walruses.
 Under-Earthmen – The Under-Earthmen are a group of people that live deep underground. They are feared for the knowledge contained within their many books, which they guard fiercely despite years of confinement below ground having robbed them of the ability to read them. In "Lion-O's Anointment Third Day: Trial of Cunning," Lion-O encountered the Under-Earthmen during his test held by Wilykit and Wilykat.

Allies of Third Earth

Captain Bragg & Crownan 
Captain Bragg (voiced by Bob McFadden) is an intergalactic ringmaster and bounty hunter who pilots a train-like spaceship called the Circus Train which he transports his captives to Wayout Back. Captain Bragg traveled to Third Earth and befriended Wilykat. Part huckster and part showman, Bragg uses his showmanship to capture both the Mutants and the Lunataks when they were transported to him by the Ancient Spirits of Evil following Mumm-Ra's failure in an ultimatum battle against Lion-O. Although a bit of a bungler in nature, Bragg becomes an ally of the ThunderCats and calls upon their assistance in subsequent appearances. On one occasion, he even attempts to flirt with Mandora the Evil-Chaser without much success.

Crownan 
Crownan is a talking crow who is Captain Bragg's wisecracking sidekick.

Dr. Dometome 
Dr. Dometome (voiced by Bob McFadden in the original series, Trevor Devall in the 2020 series) is one of Third Earth's great thinkers, scientists, and gentlemen. He is the chief protector of the Great Oceanic Plug (a massive engineering project built to seal a crack in the ocean floor to prevent the planet's oceans from flooding its core). He is a small man but very chivalrous and a skilled pilot of Hercules (aka "Herky"), a giant frog-shaped robot used to guard the sea floor.

Hachiman 
Hachiman (voiced by Peter Newman) is a samurai warrior and master swordsman from Ancient Japan. Summoned to Third Earth by Mumm-Ra, he was tricked into fighting Lion-O, but thanks to his code of Bushido, he became an ally to the ThunderCats and the Warrior Maidens of the Tree-Top Kingdom. He wields a sword known as “The Thunder-Cutter,” a katana-blade that, with his skill, can cut through solid stone. Hachiman has saved the lives of various ThunderCats on multiple occasions. Hachiman maintains a friendship with Lion-O after they first join forces. During the race to rescue Pumyra, Ben-Gali, and Lynx-O during ThunderCats- HO!, he is again briefly tricked into attacking the ThunderCats—specifically Lion-O—by Mumm-Ra. However, he eventually realizes that he has again been deceived and sides with the ThunderCats once more. In his final appearance, Hachiman is shown to be living on his own planet which resembles ancient Japan.

Mandora 
Mandora (voiced by Lynne Lipton in the original series, Erica Lindbeck in the 2020 series) is an intergalactic police officer, who works in conjunction with a series of law enforcers to protect the peaceful people of the galaxy. She works in part to run the Great Penal Planet—which houses some of the galaxy's nastiest criminals—and routinely comes to Third Earth as part of her patrols. When one of these criminals, a robotic pickpocket named Quick Pick, helps her and Lion-O against Captain Cracker, she makes him an Evil Chaser assistant. She travels on a specially equipped hoverbike called the Electro-Charger and uses a weapon called the “enzyme catalyzer"—a spray gun loaded with a chemical that she describes as follows: "An ancient formula, now a closely guarded secret. It used to be called soap." After the Mutants and the Lunataks are removed from Third Earth, Mandora becomes a member of the League of Third-Earth.

Mandora appears in ThunderCats Roar. She is shown to be annoyed with Lion-O's oafish antics when it comes to him accidentally letting the bad guys she's after escape.

Mumm-Rana 
Mumm-Rana (voiced by Lynne Lipton in the original series, Kaitlyn Robrock in the 2020 series) is an ancient sorceress for good and counterpart to Mumm-Ra. She lives in the White Pyramid where her powers (apparently bestowed upon her by "the Ancient Spirits of Goodness" whom she invokes in her very first appearance) keep her from traveling too far. She at one time battled Queen Luna (grandmother to the Lunatak Luna) to stop her rampage across Third Earth. She did so by stripping Queen Luna of her magical belt which she later lost to Luna (it was destroyed eventually). Much like Mumm-Ra, her powers limit the time she can spend outside of her pyramid home. Mumm-Rana's level of power is somewhat unclear, as she was seen to be bested in battle by Mumm-Ra in the first appearance (he used a spell to trick Mumm-Rana into thinking that the ThunderCats are evil), but she was also shown to be considerably more powerful than both Queen and Princess Luna, as she defeated both of them with relatively little effort.

In ThunderCats Roar, Mumm-Rana is first seen in "Snarf's Day Off" posing as an old lady named Mrs. Gristildi who a disguised Snarf poses as. When at the craft fair, Mrs. Gristildi has some competition from a disguised Mumm-Ra. After Snarf's disguise was exposed when fighting Mumm-Ra, this caused Mumm-Rana to shed her disguise and beat up Mumm-Ra for ruining her day. With both of them now knowing each other's secrets, Mumm-Rana and Snarf put together a calendar consisting of picture showing Mumm-Ra being beaten up.

Snowman 
The Snowman of Hook Mountain (voiced by Earl Hammond in the original series, Dave B. Mitchell in the 2020 series) is a yeti-like chivalrous knight, who rules over the Kingdom of the Snowmen on the frigid heights of Hook Mountain. He once tried to fight Lion-O for possession of a meteor that fell onto the slopes of his mountain kingdom, but they became friends after Lion-O rescued him from a Mutant attack. He can craft weapons out of ice, seemingly at will. After the Mutants and the Lunataks were removed from Third Earth, Snowman becomes a member of the League of Third Earth.

Snowmeow 
Snowmeow is the Snowman's great snow cat who serves as his mount. He tends to act as a messenger to the ThunderCats when warning them about the dangers that threaten the Snowmen.

In the 2011 series, Snowmeow had a small cameo in the ninth episode "Berbils." Snowmeow was one of the wonders being auctioned off by the Conqueror. He was described as coming "straight from Hook Mountain," implying his origins were largely the same as the original.

Sondora 
Sondora (voiced by Gerrianne Raphael) is the Keeper of the Mystical Soundstones, she assists the ThunderCats when Vultureman steals one of her stones to create a sonic weapon for the Lunataks. After Lion-O recovers the stolen Soundstone, Sondora decides to take the stones to another dimension. But she promises the ThunderCats that she would be there to help them if they ever required her assistance.

Turmagar 
Turmagar (voiced by Earl Hammond) is the leader of the walrus-like Tuska Warriors who live near the source of the river that serves as Third Earth's natural water supply. Very skilled as a warrior and leader, Turmagar is also a crafty pilot who flies the Gomplin. It is Turmagar who often helps the ThunderCats with air support before they crafted their own air-vehicles. It is worth noting that the Tuska Warriors are among the few factions in the series to employ firearms as opposed to melee weapons and/or bows and arrows. In his self-titled episode, Turmagar comes to the ThunderCats for help against the Technopede. In "Catfight," Mumm-Ra disguised himself as Turmagar in order to incite in-fighting between the original ThunderCats and the new ones.

Unicorn Keepers 
The Unicorn Keepers are two unknown humanoids that serve as the caretakers of the Unicorn Forest where they look over the forest's unicorns. Although the male Unicorn Keeper (voiced by Bob McFadden) and the female Unicorn Keeper (voiced by Lynne Lipton) are married, they are never referred to by their real name. They first appeared in "The Terror of Hammerhand" where they befriend the ThunderCats upon them coming to their aid when Hammerhand and his pirates have been poaching the unicorns. In "The Time Capsule," the female Unicorn Keeper tells Lion-O of the Black Widow Shark that dwells in the River of Despair. She uses a crystal that forms the Bridge of Light that enables Lion-O to cross the River of Despair. In "Snarf Takes up the Challenge," the female Unicorn Keeper and Robear Bill tell Snarf that the other ThunderCats have been captured by the Mutants and have been handed over to Mumm-Ra.

Wizz-Ra 
Wizz-Ra (voiced by Larry Kenney) is a powerful wizard from ancient Egypt. He lost a battle to Mumm-Ra who framed him for damaging the face of the Great Sphinx which banished Wizz-Ra to the 7th Dimension. His helmet has the ability of mind-control and is sought by Mumm-Ra after it is discovered that the wall of the 7th Dimension is weak enough (after 7,000 years) for him to appear in Cheetara's bedchamber. He aids the ThunderCats after they help him to recover his helmet, and then is forced to return to the 7th Dimension. Before departing, Wizz-Ra promising Cheetara they would meet again in her dreams.

Allies of New Thundera

Char 
Char (voiced by Bob McFadden) is a four-armed alien garbage scavenger and blacksmith who encounters Snarf as he was trying to bring the damaged pieces of the Sword of Omens back to Ben-Gali. Char wants the sword for himself, but Snarf tricks him into repairing it which causes the sword to mystically return to Lion-O. Char later apologizes for his actions and becomes an ally of the ThunderCats. In "The Heritage," Char and the ThunderKittens WilyKit and WilyKat fall under the evil influence of an evil golden orb which in reality is Mumm-Ra's lost Sphere of Setti.

Screwloose 
Screwloose is a bungling robot whom the ThunderCats enlist to assist Jagara in the repair of the Gyroscope. Mumm-Ra replaces Screwloose's brain module with one of his own creation, causing the robot to alternate between good and evil behavior. After he tries to destroy the gyroscope and kill Jagara, Lion-O uses the Sword of Omens to restore Screwloose. During the ensuing battle with Mumm-Ra, Screwloose actually defeats him by taking the Sword of Plun-Darr. In the end, Screwloose remains behind on New Thundera to help Jagara maintain the gyroscope.

Antagonists

Mumm-Ra 

Mumm-Ra (voiced by Earl Hammond in the original series, Robin Atkin Downes in the 2011 series, Patrick Seitz in the 2020 series) is the chief villain and antagonist of the ThunderCats, the demon-priest Mumm-Ra is the self-proclaimed "ever-living source of evil" on Third Earth, having powers of sorcery and an apparently unlimited lifespan. He is, in fact, a servant to the Ancient Spirits of Evil who provide him with increased power and virtual immortality to further his pursuit of spreading their dark influence throughout Third Earth.

Residing within the Black Pyramid amid the ruins of what appears to be an ancient Egyptian civilization, Mumm-Ra exists in a decayed, weakened mummified form that must return to a stone sarcophagus to replenish his energy. He can transform himself into a far more vigorous and muscular form—Mumm-Ra, the Ever-Living—by reciting the incantation: "Ancient Spirits of Evil, transform this decayed form... to Mumm-Ra, the Ever-Living!" While in this form, Mumm-Ra possesses fortification of his mystical might—casting spells, throwing energy bolts, etc.—to battle his foes. He can also alter his physical form into a variety of alter-egos to deceive his enemies.

Seemingly invincible in whatever form he chooses, Mumm-Ra appears to have a singular weakness: seeing his own hideous reflection neutralizes his ability to remain outside the Black Pyramid and forces him to withdraw there in his emaciated mummy form. However, at the beginning of the second season, the Ancient Spirits of Evil revoked this shortcoming. Mumm-Ra is a master of deception and will use whatever means necessary to fight against the forces of good. In later episodes, while endowing Mumm-Ra with his powers, the statues of the Ancient Spirits of Evil came down from their perches to extend their arms over him.

In addition, Mumm-Ra has the ability to shapeshift, which he uses to create disguises and deceive the ThunderCats on various occasions. Among these are Diamondfly (in the episode "Queen of Eight Legs"), Gregory Gregion ("All That Glitters"), Silky ("The Garden of Delights"), The Netherwitch ("The Astral Prison"), and Pumm-Ra (in the episode "Pumm-Ra"). He once took the form of King Arthur to acquire the legendary magic sword Excalibur, using it against the Sword of Omens.

In a few episodes, Mumm-Ra has an even more powerful form beyond "Mumm-Ra the Ever-Living" called "Mumm-Ra the All-Powerful". In this manifestation, Mumm-Ra absorbs the entire power of the Ancient Spirits of Evil to become grander in size and strength, and the design pattern on his loincloth changes, as does his voice. This form is only presented in the series three times. In another incarnation, invoking "the Ancient Spirits of the Dream World" to transform himself into "Mumm-Ra the Dream Master", he is able to enter dreams to subliminally influence the ThunderCats in their sleep as a form of mind control.

Mumm-Ra is regarded as immortal, and when defeated, he simply returns to his sarcophagus. Mumm-Ra cannot be truly killed; even in cases where his body is destroyed, he will eventually be restored, as he often states: "Wherever evil exists, Mumm-Ra lives!"

In later episodes, when the Ancient Spirits of Evil were increasingly disappointed with Mumm-Ra's repeated failures, they demanded he destroys the ThunderCats or else he would be forcefully removed. They dimensionally banish Ma-Mutt as an example. When Mumm-Ra fails, the Ancient Spirits of Evil trap him within a planar crystal and cast him away from Third Earth. When the ThunderCats decide to colonize New Thundera to rebuild it, the Ancient Spirits of Evil free Mumm-Ra and rebuild his pyramid there. In "The Heritage," it was said that Mumm-Ra once owned the Sphere of Seti which increased his power. When he managed to recover it after it was found by Char, he planned to use it to increase his power and free himself from servitude to Ancient Spirits of Evil. Figuring out Mumm-Ra's plan, the Ancient Spirits of Evil cut off his transformation chant and demanded he surrender the Sphere of Setti to them. Angered at his plot as well as at his deceptive attempts to hide it, the Ancient Spirits of Evil seal off the Black Pyramid, forcing Mumm-Ra to choose between sustenance (the pyramid) or power (the sphere). Ultimately, Mumm-Ra admits that he cannot survive without the pyramid—thus he begrudgingly surrenders the Sphere of Setti to them.

In the 2011 version, Mumm-Ra is an Ancient Spirit of Evil employed by the Ancient Spirits of Evil (confirmed by series Art Director Dan Norton) with changes including demon wings on his Ever-Living form, a larger body, and a weakness to intensely bright light. His ultimate goal is universal domination and enforcing his ideal order on it. Centuries prior to the new series, Mumm-Ra used advanced technology and magic at his disposal to enslave the ancestors of the ThunderCats and the Animals into serving him so he would gather the Four Powerstones from various planets to place on the Sword of Plun-Darr, a weapon forged from a star he had collapsed at the cost of the entire Plun-Darr galaxy. But managing to take the Warstone (which would become the Eye of Thundera) while staging a rebellion with the Animals' help, the ThunderCat Leo defeats Mumm-Ra and strips him of the other Powerstones. But when Mumm-Ra's pyramid spacecraft was pulled into Third Earth's atmosphere, Mumm-Ra entered his tomb to bide his time for everyone else to die in the resulting crash. However, the controls were smashed and Mumm-Ra was trapped within his pyramid as the stones and survivors spread across Third Earth. However, many centuries later, Mumm-Ra used Grune to release him from his prison and masterminded Thundera's downfall. With the aid of Grune and Slythe, Mumm-Ra not only plans to obtain the Eye of Thundera, but to regain the other three Powerstones in order to get to the Sword of Plundarr and the remaining stones. Mumm-Ra also resurrected Pumyra to serve him and planted her amongst the Thunderian slaves. After Grune ends up trapped in the Astral Plane, Mumm-Ra has Slithe recruit the homicidal Addicus and sociopathic Kaynar to not only restore the Lizard army morale and punish any who quit but also increase their numbers with members of the new generals' respective races. Later, through a calculated scheme involving his agent Pumyra, Mumm-Ra regains the Sword of Plun-Darr and the Tech Stone while gaining a new ally in Vultaire.

In ThunderCats Roar, Mumm-Ra had his Mumm-Ra the Ever-Living form when he wielded a Doom Staff. It was broken by the ThunderCats in their first battle. Mumm-Ra went through different artifacts to regain this form until he recalled that he has the Ancient Spirits of Evil.

Ma-Mutt 
Ma-Mutt is a demonic Bulldog that is Mumm-Ra's pet. While incapable of speech because of his canine physiology, he appears to be a sapient being of roughly human intelligence. Ma-Mutt has demonstrated the ability to fly as well as to grow in size and seems to have greatly enhanced strength. Ma-Mutt also harnesses the same shape-shifting capabilities as Mumm-Ra.

Ancient Spirits of Evil 
The Ancient Spirits of Evil (voiced by Earle Hyman in the original series, Jim Cummings and Kevin Michael Richardson in the 2011 series, Chris Jai Alex in the 2020 series) are four dark spirits summoned by Mumm-Ra, who represents the incarnation of malicious evil. They are both the source of Mumm-Ra's powers and his eternal masters. They communicate with him through the cauldron and giant anthropomorphic statues of a boar, vulture, crocodile, and ox. The Ancient Spirits of Evil often provide Mumm-Ra with a source of knowledge of ancient or magical events. They are, however, incapable of interacting with the physical realm outside of the Black Pyramid and thus must rely on Mumm-Ra (or other beings) to serve as avatars of their power or enact their influence accordingly. In the episode "Doomgaze," it is hinted that the Ancient Spirits of Evil are of the same race as H. P. Lovecraft's Great Old Ones, because Mumm-Ra invokes Yog-Sothoth and Cthulhu when freeing the evil Princess Ta-She from her time prison.

In the 2011 version, the statues of the Ancient Spirits of Evil that are in Mumm-Ra's chamber are made to resemble a lizard, a jackal, a monkey, and a vulture. The Ancient Spirits played a role in the creation of both the Sword of Plun-Darr, possessing a Thunderian blacksmith to forge the weapon, and the Sword of Omens, due to the blacksmith retaining the spirits' knowledge to forge a weapon similar to the previous creation. In "Native Son," it is revealed that the Ancient Spirits have been worshiped by the Tiger Clan after their ancestors were driven off to the mountains due to their loyalty to Mumm-Ra. When the Tiger Clan was on the verge of dying out from an epidemic, the spirits offer to cure them in return that the newborn Tygra (who would grow up to become an enemy to Mumm-Ra and themselves) be sacrificed. When Javan refused to honor his end of the pact, the Ancient Spirits bound the souls of the Tiger Clan to the living world as shape-shifting shadow monsters that obey their every command. Some years later, a fully-grown Tygra found his way back to his ancestral home and freed his kin of the curse. In a sense of irony, Tigra only became the threat they foresaw by ordering his death.

In ThunderCats Roar, the Ancient Spirits of Evil were revealed to have been unplugged by Mumm-Ra in the episode "Mumm-Ra the Ever Living" when they speak to him. They get annoyed with the ThunderCats when they make strange demands to them. In "Mumm-Ra of Plun-Darr," the Ancient Spirits of Evil tip off Mumm-Ra that the Sword of Plun-Darr is coming out of Third Earth's orbit.

The Mutants 
The Mutants are creatures who are the first villains seen in the series, originating from the planet Plun-Darr. They are the long-time enemies of the Thunderians. Later in the series, it is revealed that events that stemmed from their unsuccessful invasion of Thundera ultimately led to the destruction of that planet. Not content to see the Thunderians lose their homeworld, the Mutants chased after the survivors, using their spaceships to devastate the Thunderian fleet and seeming to destroy the majority of the doomed planet's escaping populace. They then boarded the flagship (which carried the ThunderCat nobles, Jaga the Wise, and the young Lion-O) in attempting to capture the Eye of Thundera. They were repelled and retreated to later relocate the crashed flagship on Third Earth. It was here that Mumm-Ra's power grounded the Mutant ship, and they were forced to follow his demands once he sank their vessel beneath the desert sands. Though they exhibited an extraordinary incompetence that was characteristic of most cartoon villains, the Mutants managed to construct their own fortress, which they called Castle Plun-Darr after their homeworld, and salvage equipment from their downed spaceship to build weapons and vehicles that they could use on Third Earth (e.g., the Skycutters, the Nosediver, etc.). There was an inconsistency in how many mutants were actually on Third Earth as some episodes had a small army guarding Castle Plun-Darr. But in most episodes, only Slithe, Monkian, Jackalman, and Vultureman, who appeared shortly after the initial few episodes as he was not present during the attack on the Thunderian flagship, were seen. They would later be joined by Rataro, a general in the mutant armies who possessed magical weapons of his own, and who was generally more competent than the primary four mutants, though he was no more successful against the Thundercats than the other mutants were.

In the 2011 series, the Mutants are referred to as "Animals" which their surviving ancestors brought to Third Earth after aiding Lion-O's ancestor Leo in defeating Mumm-Ra. However, while four of the races obtain a stone that made them each a power, the other animals were ultimately outmatched by the Cats and pitted against each other until the Lizards managed to salvage lost technology and ransacked Thundera with help from Mumm-Ra and Grune. Besides the lizards, the jackals, the monkeys, the birds (sorted into the Bird Nation and the Avistans), and the Rats, among the animal types presented in the reboot are the Dogs, the peaceful Elephants, the Fishmen, aquatic creatures that resemble the TigerSharks, and a character that looks like Mon*Star from SilverHawks.

In the 2020 series, the Mutants' roles are similar to the 1985 series where Ratar-O was depicted as their leader.

Slithe 
Slithe/Slythe (voiced by Bob McFadden in the 1985 series, Dee Bradley Baker in the 2011 series, Trevor Devall in the 2020 series) is the brutish leader of the Reptilians (referred to as Lizards in 2011 series), a race of Lizard Men. Although he lacks sophistication, his intuitive cunning is considerable. Domineering and impatient, Slithe often must browbeat the other Mutants into going along with his plans. Unlike Jackalman and Monkian (whose appearances are identical to other mutants of their kind), Slithe stands out from other Reptilians because of his ears and broader build. He pilots the Nosediver. Slithe served as Rataro's cook earlier in his career, and he retains a discriminating palate.

In the 2011 series, though a descendant of the Lizards that were enslaved by him, Slithe serves Mumm-Ra in order for his kind to take revenge on the Thunderians for generations of persecution. The Lizards have been at war with the Thunderians during their history. Succeeding in ransacking Thundera, Slithe pursues Lion-O's group before overseeing the search for the Book of Omens and later the War Stones. When it came to the attack on the Elephants' village while Mumm-Ra was in the Astral Plane, Slithe and Grune disobey Mumm-Ra's orders and attacked the village. In "Legacy," it was revealed that a Lizard named Rezard (voiced by Rob Paulsen) assisted Leo and Panthera into overthrowing Mumm-Ra. In "New Alliances," some of the Lizards that worked for Slithe have been deserting Mumm-Ra causing Slithe to prosecute any that he catches. Slithe is also instructed by Mumm-Ra to recruit Kaynar and Addicus to Mumm-Ra's services.

He was renamed "Reptílio" in the Spanish version, and "Escamoso" in the Brazilian version.

Khamai 
Khamai (voiced by James Arnold Taylor) is a chameleon-like lizard who is exclusive to the 2011 TV series. He leads a special squad of Lizards and works closely with Slithe. Khamai is killed by Lion-O.

Kask 
Kask (voiced by Matthew Mercer) is a Lizard who is exclusive to the 2011 TV series. He served as Slithe's scout lieutenant.

Sauro 
Sauro (voiced by Kevin Michael Richardson) is a Lizard who is exclusive to the 2011 TV series. He is Slithe's scout.

Jackalman 
Jackalman (voiced by Larry Kenney in the 1985 series, Dee Bradley Baker in the 2011 series, Andrew Kishino in the 2020 series) is a cautious and distrustful coward who leads the Jackalmen, a race of humanoid jackals. Though he is one to take any advantage presented to him, Jackalman often sides with Slythe to keep from being the scapegoat when plans fail. He also pilots a Skycutter.

In the 2011 series, though Slythe called him a "Jackalman", his real name is Kaynar. A deranged psychopath who was about to be placed in solitary confinement within a Dog prison, Kaynar is recruited by Slithe to be one of Mumm-Ra's new generals. Though preferring his cell, Kaynar accepts Slithe's proposal when he mentions that he can slaughter ThunderCats while allowed to "say goodbye" to his jailers. Prior to his debut, Kaynar's kind was seen in the episode "Legacy." During that time, a Jackalman named Shen (voiced by Rob Paulsen) assisted Leo and Panthera in overthrowing Mumm-Ra.

He was renamed "Chacalo" in the Spanish version.

Monkian 
Monkian (voiced by Peter Newman in the 1985 series, Robin Atkin Downes in the 2011 series, Jim Meskimen in the 2020 series) is a shifty no-good eavesdropper who is the excitable leader of the Simians (referred to as Monkeys in the 2011 series), a race of ape men. He often plays the role of scout for the Mutants and is frequently the first to run from danger. Monkian typically uses his flail and projectile-firing shield when in combat. He pilots one of the Skycutters.

In the 2011 series, though Slythe called him a "Monkian", his real name is Addicus. Addicus is a bloodthirsty barbarian who committed crimes against the Bird Nation and was sentenced to a death drop from high up in his captors' domain. However, Addicus is rescued from the fall by Slithe and recruited to be one of Mumm-Ra's new generals. Accepting the proposal, Addicus is allowed to get his revenge on the Bird Nation as Addicus states that they "owe him a last meal."

He was renamed "Mandrilo" in the Spanish version.

Vultureman 
Vultureman (voiced by Earl Hammond in the 1985 series, Michael McKean in the 2011 series, Dana Snyder in the 2020 series) is a crafty, vulture-like opportunist who serves as chief inventor and mechanical know-it-all for the Mutants. His skills with both machines and science make him frequently indispensable, but he is more often than not blamed when his devices or machines fail to live up to Slithe's expectations (In one episode, he grew tired of this and activated a hidden self-destruct mechanism in every single machine and vehicle the Mutants used, telling them that if his work was really so bad, then "See how you do without them!"). As befits a scientist, Vultureman is inquisitive and open-minded, frequently leaving him odd-man-out among his more barbaric peers. Much later, he decides to work for his own gains, and he often strikes solo deals with Mumm-Ra. He pilots a vulture-styled Flying Machine carries a crossbow-shaped weapon, and later commands weapons like the Mutank and Thundrainium Cannon. Unlike the other mutants, Vultureman was not introduced in the opening episode of the series, but a flashback reveals him working with Slithe years earlier.

In the 2011 series, he is renamed Vultaire and is a prefect of Avista (a floating futuristic city in the sky). Like the other birds in this series, Vultaire is shown with wings on his back (where the 80's version didn't have wings). Vultaire's ancestors were entrusted with the Tech Stone by Leo and used it to build Avista with the stone's power keeping Avista afloat. Like many of his kind, Vultaire is arrogant and sees himself above those who live on the land, especially the ThunderCats whom he considers to be manipulative barbarians. When the ThunderCats arrive to Avista for the Tech Stone, Vultaire accepted Tigra's challenge for the item to obtain the two stones in his group's possession. But upon losing, Vultaire refuses to honor his end of the deal and places ThunderCats under house arrest. He was momentarily held hostage by Pumrya in order to gain access to the Tech Stone. However, Vultaire purposely left the security system active as it knocked out Pumyra while having his Ravenman guards escort the ThunderCats to be thrown out of Avista with the trash before Mumm-Ra's forces to make their move. Though aiding the ThunderCats in fighting off Mumm-Ra's army, Vultaire betrays his fellow Avistans and aligns himself with Mumm-Ra upon witnessing his power firsthand. Vultaire shoots down Tygra and then quotes to Addicus "the enemy of my enemy is my friend." Vultaire joins Slithe, Kaynar, and Addicus into fighting Tygra, Panthro, and Cheetara prior to the latter knocking him out before Tygra can get payback for the bird's treachery. After Mumm-Ra claimed the Tech Stone, Vultaire joined Mumm-Ra's forces into retreating from Avista.

He was renamed "Buítro" in the Spanish version.

Ratar-O 
Ratar-O (voiced by Bob McFadden in the 1985 series, Carlo Rota in the 2011 series, Crispin Freeman in the 2020 series) is a rat-like general in the Mutant armies. This portly rodent is considered the most cunning and evil of all the Mutants. He comes to Third Earth at the behest of the Vultureman to aid them in defeating the ThunderCats. His flagship the Ratstar is a powerful war machine. Though it crashes, Ratar-O salvages parts to make a Mutank to continue the fight. He is strong and wields the Rat's Eye (a pair of kris-style daggers which have two mystical gems embedded in their hilts) that he can use to fire energy blasts, levitate foes and even fly through the air. Ratar-O is a descendant Ratilla the Terrible (the former holder of the Sword of Plun-Darr).

In the 2011 series, Ratar-O is the dictator of the Rats, a descendant of Ratilla who found the Sword of Plun-Darr after the Animals ended up on Third Earth. While under Mumm-Ra's services, the Rats served as janitors within the Black Pyramid before ending up scavengers on Third Earth. Though Ratilla used the item to turn his people into a power equal to the ThunderCats, the Sword of Plun-Darr corrupted his mind before Jaga is forced to kill him in order to seal the weapon away in what becomes Mount Plun-Darr. As the weapon's whereabouts are unknown to Mumm-Ra, Ratar-O buys the Thunderian survivors from the Lizards to use as slaves to mine for the Sword of Plun-Darr and obtain it for him due to the curse Jaga placed on it that kills any who attempt to retrieve it. When the ThunderCats raid Mount Plun-Darr as Tygra and Cheetara pose as slaves to get the sword, Lion-O's group is captured by Mordax and turned over to Ratar-O. But once Tygra and Cheetara found the Sword of Plun-Darr, it caused much of Mount Plun-Darr to collapse with Ratar-O's palace destroyed in the process. Following the castle collapse, Ratar-O battles Lion-O who manages to defeat Ratar-O as he retreats underground.

In the 2020 series, Ratar-O is depicted as the leader of the Mutants who fought Jaga wielding the Sword of Plun-Darr. At some point while in space, he does managed to reclaim the Sword of Plun-Darr some time after Thundera's destruction. When he arrives on Third Earth and gets Slithe, Jackalman, Monkian, and Vultureman on his side, Ratar-O fights the ThunderCats wielding the Sword of Omens. The ThunderCats defeat Ratar-O and throw the Sword of Plun-Darr into outer space.

Mordax 
Mordax (voiced by Kevin Michael Richardson) is an eyepatch-wearing mouse who is exclusive to the 2011 series and Ratar-O's abused second-in-command. When the ThunderCats raid Mount Plun-Darr, Pumyra is prevented from killing Mordax by Lion-O wishing to show mercy rather than force. Though Mordax takes advantage of the act of kindness by taking Lion-O, Pumyra, and Panthro prisoner and hand them over to Ratar-O. Mordax later turn against Ratar-O, refusing to kill Lion-O and by returning the Sword of Omens to him before making his escape.

The Lunataks 
Hailing from the Moons of Plun-Darr, the Lunataks are vile beings who were once feared criminals in ancient times. They dwell in Dark Side, a volcanic region on the far side of Fire-Rock Mountain. They were encased in molten rock by Mumm-Ra when they attempted to take control of the Third Earth. Mumm-Ra later had the Mutants release them on the condition that they work for him to battle the ThunderCats. However, the Lunataks instead form their own "third column" based in Dark Side where they build a massive floating fortress called Sky Tomb from which they strike against all of Third Earth.

Their numbers consist of:

 Luna (voiced by Lynne Lipton) – A midget sorceress who is the leader and chief strategist of the Lunataks. Because of her small form, she is carried around and cared for by Amok. Cruel and caustic, Luna at one time recovered the magical belt once worn by her grandmother Queen Luna that was confiscated by Mumm-Rana and used its power to grow tall and mobile again, but reverted in size when the belt was later destroyed.
 Amok (voiced by Earl Hammond) – Luna's loyal servant and bodyguard who is also her chief mode of transportation. A hulking quadrupedal Bulldog/demon-like brute with very limited capacity for vocalization, Amok is strong and fast but also displays enough cunning to exact revenge against Luna for abandoning him when she recovers Queen Luna's magical belt. He also has an innate weakness for candies and will abandon Luna in an instant if it means getting to eat it.
 Alluro (voiced by Doug Preis) – An unspecified creature with a slimy and treacherous personality, Alluro is a master of deception, mind games, and psychological warfare. He is not much of a fighter, but he uses a powerful weapon called a Psyche-Club to immobilize his foes. The crystal ball launched from his club focuses his mental powers onto a foe, allowing him to manipulate their minds with illusions or to command them to do his bidding. Unlike the other Lunatak soldiers, no connection is ever made between Alluro's powers and any condition on his home-world moon that would necessitate having them.
 Tug Mug (voiced by Bob McFadden) – A Lunatak from one of Plun-Darr's moons with strong gravity, Tug Mug proves extremely powerful in the lesser gravity of Third Earth. He can use his tripod "legs" to leap great distances, and his strength is so impressive that he once snapped the blade of the Sword of Omens with his bare hands (it was later repaired by Bengali). Combative by nature, Tug Mug can use a "gravity carbine" in battle, whose gravitation beams can make a living being or object light as air or as heavy as stone.
 Chilla (voiced by Gerrianne Raphael) – This female Lunatak from the ice moon of Plun-Darr has command over cold and heat by the power of her expelled breath, blowing to freeze the air around a target in seconds to immobilize them, or heating it through her heat beams (both optical or from her hands) to incite flames or burn them. She has little regard for life and sometimes uses her powers willfully out of spite. Her one major weakness is rock salt which is known for its ability to melt ice. Out of all the Lunataks, Chilla is the most humanoid.
 Red-Eye (voiced by Earle Hyman) – A Lunatak from the misty moon of Plun-Darr, this hulking brute has enhanced vision capabilities allowing him to see things in infra-red and even to detect the ThunderCat Tygra when invisible. A loyal follower of Luna, Red-Eye uses a spinning discus (stored in his armored chest plate) to battle his foes. He is often the engineer and pilot of Sky Tomb.

The Berserkers 
The Berserkers are the odd band of Viking-like pirates who first appeared pillaging the northern shores of the Unicorn Forest (as seen in the episode The Terror of Hammerhand). They have a habit of repeating certain words or phrases three times. The original Berserkers resembled Vikings and were apparently all killed when their ship was sunk. By the Season 2 mini-series "ThunderCats-Ho!", a revived Hammerhand had formed a second incarnation of the Berserkers with new members endowed with cybernetic bodies and powers like his own. Mumm-Ra enlisted them into capturing Lynx-O, Bengali, Pumyra, and the two Berbils that rescued them.

In the 2020 series, the Berserkers are shown to work for whoever can pay them in gold.

The Berserkers are made up of:

 Hammerhand (voiced by Earl Hammond in the original series, Trevor Devall in the 2020 series) – The leader of the Berserkers who has a cybernetic arm that can punch and pound with great force. After he and his original Berserkers were killed, Hammerhand was later mystically resurrected by Mumm-Ra who summoned up his spirit to animate a clone of Panthro which he had created. When the plan failed, Hammerhand's spirit broke Mumm-Ra's control and the clone body shifted into Hammerhand's original form before departing.
 Topspinner (voiced by Bob McFadden in the original series, Erica Lindbeck in the 2020 series) – A warrior and member of Hammerhand's second incarnation of the Berserkers who can spin at high speeds to deflect missile objects or smash opponents. His spinning can also make him dizzy.
 Ram Bam (voiced by Peter Newman in the original series, Dana Snyder in the 2020 series) – A member of Hammerhand's second incarnation of the Berserkers. Rolling by the wheel embedded in his chest, this fighter can launch himself along the ground at high speeds to smash through objects like a battering ram. Ram Bam also has rollers on his feet to help him move fast.
 Cruncher (voiced by Earle Hyman in the original series, Chris Jai Alex in the 2020 series) – A hulking pirate and member of Hammerhand's second incarnation of the Berserkers whose sheer strength can crush buildings and boulders with ease.

Grune the Destroyer 
Grune the Destroyer (voiced by Bob McFadden in the original series, Clancy Brown in the 2011 series) is a Thunderian based on the saber-toothed tiger. This former ThunderCat noble was once a good friend to Jaga the Wise on Thundera. However, his lust for power and greed turned him renegade against his fellow ThunderCats, forcing Jaga to fight him in a titanic battle that lasted for days. Grune was defeated by Jaga, then banished and sent into exile in space. He wields a mace and possesses immense superhuman strength. Eventually, his spacecraft landed on Third Earth and he began terrorizing its natives until, many years later, he was defeated (by unknown means) and sealed away inside a tomb (which was covered with a stone slab and a tree to prevent others from opening it). At some point, Grune lost one of his fangs. A mystic seal in place over the doorway to his tomb kept Grune from causing further havoc after his death, until several centuries later, when a pair of Bolkins accidentally released his spirit in the episode Ghost Warrior. Once freed, the ghost of Grune seeks out the ThunderCats and attacks them. He toys with the ThunderCats briefly before departing the Cats' Lair and attacking a city on Third Earth and demanding "Fire Rocks" (the Third earth name for Thundranium, which Grune had become immune to for unknown reasons, despite being Thunderian in origin) from them. Eventually locating the substance himself and forging a replica of his original battle club from the material, Grune would go on to attack the ThunderCats a second time in the hopes of drawing out his old arch-rival Jaga, whose spirit ultimately defeats him using both Lion-O's strength and the Eye of Thundera. However, Grune would return later when summoned by Mumm-Ra to stop Jaga's spirit from obtaining the Star of Thundera (which was needed to help free three more Thunderians—Pumyra, Ben-Gali, and Lynx-O—from the Mutant prisons at Fire-Rock Mountain). When the ThunderCats return to New Thundera, Grune is resurrected by Mumm-Ra. Grune initially succeeds in defeating Lion-O, breaking the Sword of Omens and chaining Lion-O and Cheetara up on the Churning Rocks. However, Snarf gathers the pieces of the sword and while attempting to take them to Ben-Gali for repair, he is captured by Char who repairs the sword and makes it even more powerful. Sensing the sword is repaired, Lion-O calls for it and uses it to free himself and Cheetara. Grune attempts to defeat Lion-O, but fails and is banished back to Third Earth when Lion-O activates the ThunderCat signal.

In the 2011 series, Grune is one of Claudus' trusted warriors who was best friends with Panthro in the past while confiding in him his desire to rise up the ranks. During one of their missions, Grune ripped his sabertooth off to save Panthro from Spidera. When Grune and Panthro sparred to prove themselves to get a promotion from Claudus, Claudus instead promoted Lynx-O to general and assigned Grune and Panthro to find the Book of Omens. Grune felt betrayed and drove himself mad with his own paranoia. Eventually, his jealousy towards the king was used by Mumm-Ra to convince Grune to become his follower and serve a key role in Thundera's downfall. However, Grune also intended to betray Mumm-Ra in the long run prior to leading the attack on the Elephants' village to obtain the spirit stone there resulting in Grune getting sucked into the Astral Plane thanks to Panthro (who lost his arms in the process).

In the 2020 series, Grune tried to overthrow Claudus due to him being a bad ruler only to be trapped in a crystal prison by Jaga who ejected it into outer space.

Other villains 
 Amortus (voiced by Peter Newman) – A villain who appeared in "The Touch of Amortus." He was a pinkish figure who had one short arm and an octopus tentacle on the other side. He was a being who had been trapped by Mumm-Ra on New Thundera's location called The Land of No Return. He pleaded with Mumm-Ra to release him from his imprisonment, so Mumm-Ra tasked him with destroying the ThunderCat Lynx-O. Amortus afflicted Lynx-O with his dreaded Touch of Amortus, which caused him to suffer from delusions of persecution], and he was alienated from the rest of his comrades. Lynx-O then flew to The Land of No Return to confront the source of the hallucinations, only to be inflicted with a deadlier Touch of Amortus that turned him to stone (the same move that petrified some of his other victims). He was also revealed to have turned many Thunderians to stone during his imprisonment, and it was only with the Sword of Omens that Lion-O was able to overcome the being, curing all of his teammates and temporarily reviving the stone figures, who were able to defeat him. Amortus called for Mumm-Ra to help him when the stone figures have him overwhelmed. As punishment for his failure, Mumm-Ra permanently banished him to another location.
 Baron Tass (voiced by Peter Newman) – A Thunderian baron of indeterminate feline motive who arrives on New Thundera in "Well of Doubt." He is shown to have a history with Torr. Baron Tass tried to cash in on old debts, but Lion-O forbade him. He discovered the Well of Doubt and gave its water to Lion-O, where its waters filled Lion-O with doubt. After Lion-O was effected by the waters and Jagara discovered that the water he was given from the Well of Doubt, Baron Tass attacks the ThunderCats with some stone statues. Once Lion-O overcomes the effects of the Well of Doubt and defeats the stone statues, Baron Tass promises to change his ways starting with Lion-O having Baron Tass sealing off the entrance to the Well of Doubt.
 Mr. Grubber (voiced by Bob McFadden) – A Thunderian of indeterminate feline motive who is Baron Tass's bookkeeper and assisted him in his plot.
 Boatman – A hooded robed boatman who appeared in "Lion-O's Anointment Final Day: The Trial of Evil." He tried to stop Lion-O from traveling down the River of Doom.
 Burnout (voiced by Bob McFadden) – Burnout was a robot criminal that was accidentally released by Lion-O in "Mandora the Evil Chaser." Lion-O helped Mandora recapture him.
 Captain Cracker (voiced by Earl Hammond) – A robotic space pirate who commands a starship named the Jolly Rogers. In "Mandora and the Pirates," he raids the Great Penal Planet to release a criminal contingent to help him take over the space-ways. He, his pirates, and the villains were defeated by Lion-O and Mandora. In "Exile Isle," he and the Lunataks team up to plan a destructive return to Third Earth. In "Cracker's Revenge," Captain Cracker lands on Way Outback and free the Lunataks and put Bragg and Crownan in one of the train's cages. They plan to go to Third Earth to attack it, since most of the ThunderCats are no longer on Third Earth. They were defeated by the ThunderCats when they were knocked into the moat surrounding Cat's Lair.
 Polly (voiced by Bob McFadden) – Captain Cracker's robotic parrot.
 Captain Shiner (voiced by Bob McFadden in a German accent) – A monocle-wearing, dog-like space-faring alien mercenary commanding a starship named The Vertus and its sizeable crew. He is summoned on more than one occasion to carry out Mumm-Ra's bidding (for a substantial fee) although he did help the ThunderCats escape from a black hole. In the second appearance, he was instructed by Mumm-Ra to take the three Thunderians Lynx-O, Pumyra, and Bengali to Fire-Rock Mountain to be locked away near where some Thundranium is located. After Lynx-O, Pumyra, and Bengali are imprisoned in Fire-Rock Mountain, Captain Shiner engaged the Thundercats which ended with his ship being rocketed off to another location in outer space.
 Charr-Nin – Charr-Nin is a genie who was released from the Great Golden Harp by Wilykit and Wilykat as seen in "The Evil Harp of Charr-Nin."
 Child of Gorgon – The Child of Gorgon is an evil giant that was seen in "The Mask of Gorgon." It was imprisoned in stone thousands of years ago with the formation becoming the Hills of Elfshima. Mumm-Ra woke the Child of Gorgon by using the Sword of Omens' sight beyond sight on the Mask of Gorgon. Once the Mask of Gorgon was destroyed, the Child of Gorgon was also destroyed.
 Conquedor (voiced by Jon Polito) – Exclusive to the 2011 series, Conquedor is a robotic villain who has been capturing Berbils and selling them to the highest bidder. After the ThunderCats had crashed his auction and freed the Berbils and the other creatures in his possession, Conquedor led the Giantors and the Trollogs to attack the Berbils. With help from the Berbils, the ThunderCats were able to defeat the Trollogs and Giantors while Lion-O defeats Conquedor.
 Demolisher (voiced by Peter Newman) – Only appearing in a single episode, Demolisher is one of the more powerful foes to challenge the ThunderCats. Similar to Safari Joe, his motives are not power but glory. A dog-like being (resembling a thylacine), the Demolisher travels from planet to planet seeking a worthy opponent to battle with his arsenal of high-tech weapons. The Demolisher originally lands on Third Earth to battle Mumm-Ra. After Mumm-Ra is defeated by the galactic warrior, he convinces him that Lion-O is a far worthier conquest. Thus persuaded, the Demolisher seeks out and engages Lion-O in battle but is eventually overcome. Defeated, the Demolisher flees Third Earth in shame. Lion-O laments that such a strong and courageous warrior must live without a cause to fight for, stating, "...I wish he had joined us in our fight to spread the code of Thundera."
 Dirge – A stumpy armadillo-like drummer who is a companion of Demolisher. He serves the role of a cheerleader/herald and is somewhat of a "Snarf" to the Demolisher's "Lion-O."
 Driller (voiced by Bob McFadden in the original series, Matthew Mercer in the 2011 series, Stephen Tobolowsky in the 2020 series) – A metallic demon of the sand who has a drill in place of legs. He also has changeable drill bits on his head, which allows him to drill through the sand, rock, and dirt in the deep desert. His services are for hire; his chief price is diamonds, which he needs to keep his drill points sharp. He once captured Panthro for Mumm-Ra, and appeared again to drill a tunnel from Acid Lake to the Cat's Lair. Driller starred in "Spitting Image" (where he was hired by Mumm-Ra to capture Panthro), "Return Of the Driller," "Jackalman's Rebellion" (where he and Molemaster teamed up with Jackalman), and "The Mechanical Plague" (where he was reactivated by Mumm-Ra). In the 2011 reboot, Driller is a robot built by Grune to mine for Thundrillium. Driller managed to buy Grune sometime to get away before being deactivated by Lion-O.
 Duelist (voiced by Miguel Ferrer) – Exclusive to the 2011 series, the Duelist is a professional swordsman who claims the swords of his defeated opponents. One of his swords in his possession is the Sword of Hittanzo which he claimed from its sword-maker Hittanzo. He challenges Lion-O to a sword match with the Sword of Omens as its wager. Though the Duelist wins the sword, Lion-O manages to get it back with help from the Drifter (who was really Hittanzo all along) while disarming the Duelist of his swords. When the Duelist tries to attack Lion-O, Hittanzo intervenes and drives the Duelist out of town.
 Enflamer (voiced by Bob McFadden) – Enflamer is a creature who has mastery over the fire as seen in "All That Glitters." Lion-O had to seek out Enflamer in order to reforge the Sword of Omens. A mutant attack had drained Enflamer of his powers. After a bath in molten gold caused by the ThunderCats, the Enflamer emerged and reforged the sword. However, he turns against the ThunderCats and taunts Lion-O. The ThunderCats managed to defeat Enflamer.
 Frog Man (voiced by Earl Hammond) – Frog Man is a humanoid frog who was the survivor of another planet that crash-landed on Thundera centuries ago. He tried to destroy the planet with a flood so that he can claim it as his own when his own planet's water dried out but was imprisoned by the Thunderians after his fight with Jaga. On New Thundera, he is accidentally freed by WilyKit and WilyKat. Pretending to be their friend, Frog Man quickly turns on them and tries to sink the new Cat's Lair. In the end, Lion-O is able to defeat him and trap him in his original prison.
 Ice King – An ancient king from 1,000 years ago who appeared in the episode "Secret of the Ice King." He emerged from a melted glacier where he caused havoc to the Snowmen. Ice King managed to freeze most of the ThunderCats except for Cheetara. She manages to use the Sword of Omens to thaw Lion-O and the other ThunderCats. The ThunderCats discover that the Ice King is looking for an ancient egg to see his wife one last time before he dies. The ThunderCats now understand his actions and assist him in finding the egg.
 Mad Bubbler (voiced by Bob McFadden) – A reptilian phantom that inhabits the Hook Mountain thundrilium mines. The Mad Bubbler bears an uncanny resemblance to the bubble dragons from Bubble Bobble.
 Malcar (voiced by Bob McFadden) – An ancient alchemist whom Mumm-Ra summoned from the dead in Tomb Town in a plot to transmute Thundrillium into Thundranium on New Thundera. When he was revived as an old man, Mumm-Ra needed to send Malcar to the Canyons of Youth twice in order to restore his youth so that he could more effectively attack the ThunderCats. However, this plan backfires the second time as Mumm-Ra accidentally leaves Malcar in the Canyons of Youth making him revert into an infant due to Jaga's interference. With no memory of his previous life, the baby Malcar is given by Lion-O to be adopted by a Thunderian couple who arrived on New Thundera.
 Mirror Wraith (voiced by Peter Newman) - A demon who hides behind the mirrors. The Ancient Spirits of Evil summoned Mirror Wraith to help Mumm-Ra when a pod containing the Thunderian girl Leah crash-landed in the Jungles of Darkness. Mumm-Ra disguised Mirror Wraith as a doll and gave it to Leah so that he can get into Cats' Lair. Snarf and Leah used the fire extinguishers to cover up all the mirrors to defeat Mirror Wraith. After Mumm-Ra transported Mirror Wraith back to the Dark Pyramid, he has the Ancient Spirits of Evil deal with him. The Ancient Spirits of Evil teleported Mirror Wraith away.
 Molemaster (voiced by Bob McFadden) – A moleman who enslaved the other mole people to work in his tunnels as seen in "Time Capsule." He was defeated by Tygra. He later returns in "Jackalman's Rebellion" where he teamed up with Jackalman and Driller.
 Mongor (voiced by Bob McFadden in the 1985 series, Andrew Morgado in the 2020 series) – A demonic goat-like being believed to be the personification of fear on Third Earth. For three centuries, Mumm-Ra had unsuccessfully tried to locate his tomb and free him, but the ThunderKittens accidentally freed Mongor allowing him to attack and subdue the other ThunderCats. He feeds from his opponents' fears to grow larger and more powerful. His only weakness is for his foes not to look directly at him, which takes away his power (as Lion-O, WilyKit and WilyKat discover to defeat him).
 Nemex (voiced by Earle Hyman) – Nemex is a three-eyed, four-armed imp-like creature of the Netherworld who once captured Jaga in "The Astral Prison."
 Ninja (voiced by Earl Hammond) – In "The Thunder-Cutter," Mumm-Ra summoned a ninja to defeat Hachiman after Mumm-Ra's deception on Hachiman is revealed.
 Plutar (voiced by Peter Newman) – Plutar is a criminal from the dark planet Onyx who was accidentally released by Lion-O in "Mandora the Evil Chaser." Plutar is known for his toxic touch. He was recaptured by Lion-O and Mandora.
 Pyron – Pyron is a warrior that was summoned into the Book of Omens by the Ancient Spirits of Evil in "The Book of Omens." He was the Ancient Spirits of Evil's champion, yet was easily defeated by Lion-O with the help of the dragon heads that are wrapped around the pillars near the Book of Omens' entity.
 Queen Tartara (voiced by Lynne Lipton) – A selfish queen who has riches in her crystal kingdom. She steals the Arrietta bird from the Ro-Bear Berbils (who were hoping to get a good harvest) so the queen would get it to sing for her only. She has guards that are blindfolded for she forbids them to look at her treasures. She traps Lion-O in crystal casing as punishment for being in her treasure room. Snarf entered the queen's treasure room by digging under. He manages to free the Arrietta bird so it could sing high notes to help get Lion-O out of the crystal casing. Panthro arrives in the Thundertank before the queen's guards could destroy Lion-O, Snarf, and the Arrietta bird. It can be assumed that Queen Tartara perished as her kingdom collapsed.
 Quick Pick (voiced by Bob McFadden) – Quick Pick is a robotic pickpocket and escapes artist who was accidentally released by Lion-O in "Mandora the Evil Chaser." He was recaptured by Lion-O and Mandora after the other ThunderCats saved them from the Mudhogs. In "Mandora and the Pirates," he is among the inmates in the Gray Penal Planet who is released by Captain Cracker. He helps Lion-O and Mandora defeat Captain Cracker. Mandora plans to speak to the Galactic Governor to have a pardon given to Quick Pick in order to make him her assistant.
 Rhino – A Rhinosauran (which is a rhinoceros-headed gorilla) criminal who was incarcerated on the Gray Penal Planet. In "Mandora and the Pirates," Captain Cracker and his crew invaded the Grey Prison Planet and freed Rhino in order to help him capture Mandora.
 Safari Joe (voiced by Larry Kenney in an Australian accent in the 1985 series, Trevor Devall in the 2020 series) – An intergalactic big-game hunter who ventures to Third Earth to hunt the ThunderCats in his self-titled episode after he had successfully hunted the Big Cats, Sky Cats, and Aqua Cats. He uses a rifle that has a variable arsenal of weapons (like capture claws, fire rounds, missiles, etc.). Safari Joe was known for his trademark slogan "Safari Joe...does it again!" Safari Joe manages to capture all the ThunderCats through different traps associated with their weaknesses and imprison them in cages made of Thundranium. He captures Wilykit and Wilykat by shooting darts into their hoverboards, fires energy bolts on Cheetara to negate her speed, traps Tygra in water, and uses an illusion of an energy bat to trap Panthro. Safari Joe fails to capture Lion-O thanks to Snarf supplying a distraction. When Safari Joe finds himself out of ammunition, he is revealed to be nothing more than a coward and is defeated by Lion-O. Safari Joe was made to promise that he would never hunt again and Mule was reprogrammed to ensure he kept his word. In "Fond Memories," Mumm-Ra creates a gallery trap for Lion-O with Safari Joe being one of the portraits alongside Slithe, Ratar-O, and Spidera.
 Mule (voiced by Bob McFadden) – Safari Joe's robot assistant whose head is shaped like a train. He helps to assemble traps, using a computerized analyzer called the Holojector to provide information on his prey which includes the information on their strengths and weaknesses. After Safari Joe was defeated by Lion-O, Mule was reprogrammed to make sure Safari Joe keeps his word to never hunt again.
 Scrape (voiced by Bob McFadden) – Scrape is a salvage expert from the planet Blue Plunder. In "Dr. Dometone," Scrape came to Thundera where his superiors wanted him to mine a certain rock. In order to do this, he would have to remove the Great Oceanic Plug. This led him into conflict with Dr. Dometone (who was the guardian of the Great Oceanic Plug) and the ThunderCats. With help from Dr. Dometone, the ThunderCats managed to defeat Scrape and hand him over to Mandora so that she can have Scrape remanded to the Gray Penal Planet.
 See-Thu – See-Thu is a robotic criminal with a transparent outer shell who was incarcerated on the Gray Penal Planet. In "Mandora and the Pirates," Captain Cracker and his crew free See-Thu in order to help him capture Mandora.
 Shadowmaster (voiced by Peter Newman) – A wizard on Thundera who used a cloak of darkness to conjure his magical powers and attempted to take over the planet. He was defeated by both Jaga and Lion-O's father, Claudus, and was then banished to the "Shadow Realm," but he managed to escape years later, kidnapping Claudus just before Thundera was destroyed. Through a sequence of nightmares, Lion-O eventually learns of his father's imprisonment in the Shadow Realm and is able to rescue him. The Shadowmaster has arguably come closer to defeating the ThunderCats than anyone else. In his one-time assault on the ThunderCats, the Shadowmaster would have succeeded had Mumm-Ra not interfered for fear that the Shadowmaster would replace him as the chief servant to the Ancient Spirits of Evil.
 Ta-She (voiced by Lynne Lipton) – A beautiful princess from ancient times who was imprisoned in the time continuum on her boat operated by her humanoid crocodile servants. She wields the power of the Doomgaze which enables her to mesmerize males with her beauty. The Ancients Spirits of Evil ordered Mumm-Ra to have the Mutants free her. They needed to obtain items in order to free Ta-She which included the hair of a cheetah (which ended up being a sample of Cheetara's hair), the tears of a Berbil (which Mumm-Ra extracted from Robear Belle), the shoe of a unicorn, and a hero to take her place (Mumm-Ra planned to have Lion-O be the candidate for this). Freed by Mumm-Ra, Ta-She puts the male ThunderCats under her spell. She is ultimately defeated by Cheetara (who is a woman was completely immune to the effects of Ta-She's beauty) and is then returned to her eternal prison.
 Technopede – An enormous mechanical centipede-like creature, the Giant Technopede is a war machine from the past. It is extremely destructive and endowed with lethal weapons systems. The ThunderCats prevented it from eradicating the Tuska people. In "The Mechanical Plague," Mumm-Ra reactivates the Technopede.
 Tookit (voiced by Fred Tatasciore) – Exclusive to the 2011 series, Tookit is a humanoid raccoon that resides in the City of Dogs. A gentleman thief by trade, Tookit possesses a precognitive ability called Kleptovoyance, enabling him to see the potential use in pickpocketed items and people alike order to improve his chances in stealing something of greater value. This ability, in turn, makes Tookit a firm believer in preordain circumstances as he managed to obtain the Forever Bag from a fellow thief and proceeds in forcing Gusto, Jenyo, and Albo into his services by placing them in positions where he is the only one to keep them safe from the Dogs' justice system. He used that same tactic on Wilykat and Wilykit during their stay in the city, testing their abilities after he stole their items and later set them up as public enemies to keep them from leaving. However, the twins convince their fellow blackmailed peers to expose Tookit as they made a plan to stall him long enough for the Dog Constable to overhear him willingly admit that he subtly forced them into a life of crime without any regrets. Taking what he believed to be the Forever Bag, Tookit realized too late that it was a forgery with the real bag now owned by the twins. Though seemingly accepting being subjected to The Pit, Tookit secretly harbored a hairpin he stole earlier on his person with the intent to escape as he winks towards the viewers.
 Two Time (voiced by Bob McFadden) – Two Time is a robot with heads on both ends of his body where both sides of his body switch positions at different points. His base of operations is a flying fortress called Dome-Down. In his first appearance, Two Time had captured a family of Thunderian refugees near the Churning Rocks on New Thundera. In his second appearance, Two Time ambushed an Ecology Inspector who was coming to inspect the new Cat's Lair and even tried to contain Cat's Lair in his Dome-Down ship in order to sell it to other alien races.
 Warbot – The Warbot is a giant four-legged robot created by the Mutants in an attempt to destroy the ThunderCats as seen in "Return to Thundera." The Mutants had planned to create the Warbot back on Plun-Darr, but didn't have the chance. When Lion-O travels back to Thundera before it exploded, Lion-O received the blueprints for it from Claudus. Using the blueprints upon returning to the present, Lion-O is able to find the Warbot's Achilles Heel. In "Mechanical Plague," Mumm-Ra reactivates the Warbot in order to attack the ThunderCats.
 Wolfrat – A giant wolf/rat-like infiltration robot created by Vultureman in its self-titled episode. Mumm-Ra modified the robot with miniaturization gas where it manages to shrink most of the ThunderCats during its attack on Cats' Lair. With help from a normal-sized Snarf, the miniature ThunderCats managed to destroy Wolfrat. In "Mechanical Plague," Mumm-Ra reactivates Wolfrat in order to attack the ThunderCats.
 Zaxx (voiced by Bob McFadden) – A four-armed birdman sorcerer who unsuccessfully fought Mumm-Ra for control of Third Earth in the distant past. Zaxx was left without form as his essence was trapped within a magical medallion. Any creature later wearing the medallion acquires his fantastic power but is progressively transformed to permanently become Zaxx, who requires a host body for retribution against his ancient foe. His medallion was discovered by Vultureman who escaped from his incarceration. Thanks to the ThunderCats, the medallion was placed on Mumm-Ra as they both fall into the cauldron. Though Mumm-Ra later emerged from it alive. Snarf commented that Zaxx accomplished his mission to defeat Mumm-Ra.
 Zig (voiced by Richard Chamberlain) – Exclusive to the 2011 series, Zig is the leader of the Wood Forgers who specialize is mystic paper arts. He is the headmaster of the established School of Paper Arts. When he and his followers saved the ThunderCats from the fearsome spirits of the forest, Zig claimed that the Wood Forgers were the protectors of the Forest of Magi Ore and that the giant bird Viragor has been attacking it. Lion-O eventually discovered that Viragor was the protector of the Forest of Magi Ore and that the Wood Forgers were the enemies. With the help of Viragor, the ThunderCats were able to drive away Zig and his followers with Viragor taking over as the headmaster of the Wood Forgers' school.
 Gami – A female Wood Forger who is a disciple of Zig.
 Nips – A Wood Forger who is a follower of Zig.

Creatures 
The following creatures are located on Third Earth, New Thundera, or any other place in this franchise:

 Arrietta bird – A magnificent, yet scarce species of bird that lives on Third Earth. If they show up in the Berbil Village to sing their song, it means that the Berbils will have a good harvest. Queen Tartara once tried to steal an Arrietta bird so that it can sing to her in her palace, but it was rescued by Lion-O, Panthro, and Snarf.
 Astral Moat Monster – A monster that lives in the moats of the Astral Prison and guards it against any trespassers.
 Black Widow Shark – A large, aggressive shark-like creature with crustacean-like legs that lives in the River of Despair.
 Burglenot – Exclusive to the 2011 series, the Burglenots are four-eyed reptile-like Bulldogs that are used to guard the stores in the City of Dogs.
 Chib-Chib – Exclusive to the 2011 series, the Chib-Chibs are bird/deer-like creatures with long necks, zebra-like stripes, goat/sheep-like ears, and bird-like heads. The male Chib-Chibs have horns. While Lion-O and Tygra were trying to look for a way through the mountains, the other ThunderCats had to gather supplies from the forest with one of them ending up hunting the Chib-Chibs much to the dismay of Wilykit and Wilykat. Later on, Wilykit and Wilykat helped to defend the Chib-Chibs from an unnamed warthog/skunk-like creature. After Wilykit and Wilykat fended off the creature, the Chib-Chibs rewarded them by giving them a supply of berries.
 Firebat – A type of bat that is made of fire. In "All That Glitters," Lion-O encounters a Firebat when making his way towards the Enflamer.
 Frogdog – Small creatures that are known to roam around Castle Plun-Darr. In "Return to Thundera," Mumm-Ra and the Mutants demonstrate the Warbot's petrifying ray on a Frogdog.
 Giant Treetop Spider – Spider-like creatures who are allies of the Warrior Maidens. In "The Fireballs of Plun-Darr," Lion-O and Willa use a Giant Treetop Spider named Bushy to infiltrate Castle Plun-Darr and free Tygra.
 Gomplin – The Gomplins are flying lizard/camel creatures that have been domesticated by the Tuskas centuries ago and serve as their mode of transportation.
 Gorot-Rot – A giant two-headed dinosaur with snake-like fangs and tongues that lives in the waters of Third Earth. In "Lion-O's Annointment Second Day: The Trial of Speed," Lion-O encounters a Gorot-Rot when taking a shortcut during his race against Cheetara.
 Hopper – Giant grasshoppers that serve as a mode of transportation for the Trolls.
 Lizarthon – The Lizarthon is a dinosaur-like creature. In "Trouble with Time," Lion-O saves Willa from a Lizarthon that attacks both of them.
 Lucy – Exclusive to the 2011 series, Lucy is a giant caterpillar that is owned by Ponzi and serves as his mode of transportation. When the Cats and Ponzi were gathering leaves from the Caracara Tree, Lucy ended up eating most of them and ended up scolded by Ponzi. Lucy climbed up the Caracara Tree and made a cocoon around herself. When Mumm-Ra in the body of Sycorax attacked, Lucy emerged from her cocoon during the battle as a giant butterfly who manages to crystallize Sycorax with her Caracara-infused wings.
 Miggit Swarm Monster – The Miggit Swarm Monster resides on Third Earth. It is said that it resides near the River of Despair and the Living Ooze.
 Mumm-Randall (voiced by Victor Courtright) - Exclusive to ThunderCats Roar, Mumm-Randall is a slow-moving donkey who is owned by a Wolo that the ThunderCats try to find in "Snarf's Day Off." At the end of the episode, he is shown on top of Mrs. Gristildi's house as the ThunderCats haven't found him yet. Mumm-Randall introduces himself to the viewers and states that he is actually the neutral opposite of Mumm-Ra and Mumm-Rana.
 Pterodactyl – Flying reptiles that live in different parts of Third Earth. In "Secret of the Ice King," one Pterodactyl was indirectly responsible for the release of the Ice King.
 Ramlak – Exclusive to the 2011 series, the Ramlak is a vast tentacled sea anemone-type creature that prowled the Sand Sea where it remained submerged whilst it sought out prey. Typically, the beast's tentacled mouth remained encased in a protective shell that resided below the sands whilst its tentacles attacked its food. When it consumed its prey, the creature's mouth emerged and the tentacle feeders by it were capable of extending in order to swallow food completely. The tentacles of the creature were strong enough to rip apart entire ships and it was known to consume large quantities of water which it stored within its body. One such Ramlak was known to have consumed the entire watery oasis home of the Fishmen. This left Koinelius Tunar with nothing but rage and he assembled a crew of his fellow Fishmen who traveled the Sand Sea in order to slay the beast. As part of their plans, they used to leave food floating on the sands to attract the beast and incidentally captured the ThunderCats who were being led by Lion-O. Before the Fishmen could kill them, the Ramlak attacked their ship but were driven off by Lion-O and his comrades. Following Captain Tunar explaining his past, Lion-O decided to accompany him in slaying the beast. They ultimately managed to find the creature but Captain Tunar's single-minded pursuit of revenge led to the loss of the ship along with the near death of the entire crew. This forced Lion-O to save the crew whilst Koinelius Tunar attempted to slay the creature only to be dragged into the Sand Sea where he was presumed to had been killed. When the Ramlak emerged once more, she seemingly swallowed Lion-O only for Lion-O to use the Sword of Omens to slice her apart from the inside. With her death, the entire stolen water of the Fishmen home was released into the sands creating a paradise oasis for the surviving crew who decided to remain behind.
 Sandy-Tailed Hooji – A small furry animal that is native to New Thundera. In "Crystal Canyon," Panthro gifts Lynx-O a Sandy-Tailed Hooji to keep as a pet.
 Sea-Quines – Gentle seahorse-like creatures that reside in the oceans of Third Earth.
 Shadowbeast – A powerful monster that is vulnerable to bright light. In "The Shadowmaster," a Shadowbeast is unleashed by the Shadowmaster to attack Lion-O.
 Snake Birds – Small flying pink snakes. In "The Evil Harp of Charr-Nin," Wilykit had Charr-Nin retrieve a Snake Bird as part of a distraction.
 Spidera – A giant queen spider that rules the kingdom of webs. One of her servants captures Snarf. Lion-O fights Spidera and is knocked onto Spidera's web. Lion-O becomes trapped in her web. The other ThunderCats arrive to fight Spidara only to have Cheetara and Tygra become entangled in her webs. Snarf manages to throw the Sword of Omens to Lion-O, allowing himself and the other ThunderCats to defeat Spidera. In "Fond Memories," Mumm-Ra creates a gallery trap for Lion-O with Spidera being one of the portraits alongside Slithe, Ratar-O, and Safari Joe. In the 2011 series, Spidera was depicted as a giant spider that Panthro and Grune encountered after busting out of a prison camp during the Lizard War. Panthro told Wilykit and Wilykat that Spidera had him trapped until Grune ripped out his sabretooth and stabbed Spidera in her weak spot.
 Sycorax – Exclusive to the 2011 series, Sycorax is a dinosaur-like monster with bone-plated armor and was already dead before the series started. Mumm-Ra resurrected the Sycorax to use as his vessel so that he can attack the ThunderCats in daylight. The Sycorax is shown to have an unforeseen weakness to the leaves of the Caracara Tree. During the second battle, the ThunderCats had a hard time-fighting Sycorax until Ponzi's caterpillar Lucy emerged from her cocoon as a butterfly and ended up crystallizing Sycorax with her wings. Mumm-Ra emerged from Sycorax's body in raven form and got away.
 Thunderian Mount – Exclusive to the 2011 series, the Thunderian Mounts are cat-like horses that serve as a mode of transportation for the Thunderians.
 Tongueosaurus – Large semi-aquatic animals that live in the River of Despair.
 Tricorn Elk – The Tricorn Elk is a noble animal with strange-looking antlers. In "The Telepathy Beam," Alluro mesmerized a Tricorn Elk as part of a plot for the Lunataks to capture Panthro.
 Unicorn – One-horned horses that reside in the Forest of Unicorns. A herd of them is watched over by the Unicorn Keepers. The Unicorns are considered rare creatures on Third Earth and there are often attempts by rogue individuals to capture the Unicorns and sell them. ThunderCats Roar features a talking unicorn named Gwen (voiced by Kaitlyn Robrock).
 Viragor (voiced by Héctor Elizondo) – Exclusive to the 2011 series, Viragor is a large magnificent bird with an owl-like face and bat-like ears that lives on Third Earth. Viragor is a wise and powerful being who has been living in the Forest of Magi Ore for centuries protecting it from anyone who would harm it. He was once aided in protecting the Forest of Magi Ore by Zig and his Wood Forgers even when the Wood Forgers had created magic paper. When Zig desired more wood to make more magic papers, they turned against Viragor by cutting down some trees instead of harvesting the wood from the dead trees. When the ThunderCats arrived in the Forest of Magi Ore, Zig lied to the ThunderCats stating that Viragor is a threat to the Forest of Magi Ore. When Lion-O's sword attacks were unable to work on Viragor, he eventually learned the truth when he was snatched into the skies by him. When the truth was known to the other ThunderCats, they helped Viragor drive away from the Wood Forgers. After the battle, Viragor used the wood from the oldest tree in the Forest of Magi Ore to make Cheetara a new staff after her previous one broke during the battle.
 Winged Water Snake – Flying snakes that reside near the Geysers of Life.
 Wraith – Exclusive to the 2011 series, the Wraiths are insect-like creatures that fly in large swarms like locusts. A swarm of Wraits lives near the Elephants' village and targets their harvests. When Lion-O trapped them in a cave, it was revealed that the buzzing of their wings is what kept a Stone Giant dormant.

References

External links 

 
 
 ThunderCats | Free Online Videos and Downloads | Cartoon Network

Lists of characters in American television animation
Lists of comics characters
Characters